This is a partial list of unnumbered minor planets for principal provisional designations assigned during 1–30 November 2001. , a total of 416 bodies remain unnumbered for this period. Objects for this year are listed on the following pages: A–E · Fi · Fii · G–O · P–R · S · T · U · V–W and X–Y. Also see previous and next year.

V 

|- id="2001 VB" bgcolor=#FFC2E0
| 3 || 2001 VB || APO || 18.4 || data-sort-value="0.74" | 740 m || single || 8 days || 11 Nov 2001 || 53 || align=left | Disc.: LINEARPotentially hazardous object || 
|- id="2001 VD" bgcolor=#E9E9E9
| 0 || 2001 VD || MBA-M || 17.3 || 1.5 km || multiple || 2001–2019 || 01 Jan 2019 || 86 || align=left | Disc.: Emerald Lane Obs.Alt.: 2014 WK117 || 
|- id="2001 VJ1" bgcolor=#d6d6d6
| 0 ||  || MBA-O || 16.61 || 2.7 km || multiple || 2001–2021 || 08 Jun 2021 || 44 || align=left | Disc.: LPL/Spacewatch IIAdded on 24 December 2021 || 
|- id="2001 VC2" bgcolor=#FFC2E0
| 0 ||  || APO || 21.30 || data-sort-value="0.20" | 200 m || multiple || 2001–2021 || 01 Jun 2021 || 188 || align=left | Disc.: LINEARPotentially hazardous object || 
|- id="2001 VD2" bgcolor=#FFC2E0
| 7 ||  || APO || 25.6 || data-sort-value="0.027" | 27 m || single || 3 days || 11 Nov 2001 || 41 || align=left | Disc.: LINEARAMO at MPC || 
|- id="2001 VE2" bgcolor=#FFC2E0
| 6 ||  || APO || 25.0 || data-sort-value="0.036" | 36 m || single || 7 days || 16 Nov 2001 || 64 || align=left | Disc.: LINEAR || 
|- id="2001 VF2" bgcolor=#FFC2E0
| 1 ||  || AMO || 20.2 || data-sort-value="0.32" | 320 m || multiple || 2001–2018 || 07 Sep 2018 || 100 || align=left | Disc.: LINEAR || 
|- id="2001 VQ2" bgcolor=#fefefe
| 0 ||  || MBA-I || 18.50 || data-sort-value="0.59" | 590 m || multiple || 2001–2021 || 07 Jul 2021 || 48 || align=left | Disc.: LINEAR || 
|- id="2001 VT2" bgcolor=#fefefe
| 0 ||  || MBA-I || 17.86 || data-sort-value="0.80" | 800 m || multiple || 2001–2021 || 07 Nov 2021 || 201 || align=left | Disc.: LINEAR || 
|- id="2001 VG3" bgcolor=#d6d6d6
| 0 ||  || MBA-O || 16.72 || 2.5 km || multiple || 2001–2021 || 28 Sep 2021 || 87 || align=left | Disc.: Spacewatch || 
|- id="2001 VH3" bgcolor=#d6d6d6
| 0 ||  || MBA-O || 16.26 || 2.3 km || multiple || 2001–2021 || 11 Jun 2021 || 146 || align=left | Disc.: SpacewatchAlt.: 2010 GN114, 2012 UT58 || 
|- id="2001 VL3" bgcolor=#d6d6d6
| 0 ||  || MBA-O || 16.4 || 2.9 km || multiple || 2001–2020 || 29 Jan 2020 || 76 || align=left | Disc.: Spacewatch || 
|- id="2001 VH5" bgcolor=#FFC2E0
| 0 ||  || AMO || 21.18 || data-sort-value="0.21" | 210 m || multiple || 2001–2021 || 09 May 2021 || 95 || align=left | Disc.: NEAT || 
|- id="2001 VJ5" bgcolor=#FFC2E0
| 2 ||  || APO || 22.0 || data-sort-value="0.14" | 140 m || multiple || 2001–2018 || 11 Apr 2018 || 37 || align=left | Disc.: LINEARPotentially hazardous object || 
|- id="2001 VM5" bgcolor=#FFC2E0
| 7 ||  || AMO || 25.1 || data-sort-value="0.034" | 34 m || single || 5 days || 16 Nov 2001 || 13 || align=left | Disc.: LINEAR || 
|- id="2001 VW5" bgcolor=#E9E9E9
| 0 ||  || MBA-M || 17.01 || 2.2 km || multiple || 2001–2021 || 12 May 2021 || 132 || align=left | Disc.: LINEAR || 
|- id="2001 VG6" bgcolor=#fefefe
| 0 ||  || MBA-I || 18.0 || data-sort-value="0.75" | 750 m || multiple || 2001–2021 || 18 Jan 2021 || 179 || align=left | Disc.: LINEARAlt.: 2010 CU72 || 
|- id="2001 VU6" bgcolor=#E9E9E9
| 0 ||  || MBA-M || 17.10 || 1.6 km || multiple || 2001–2021 || 05 Jun 2021 || 247 || align=left | Disc.: LINEARAlt.: 2014 SY298 || 
|- id="2001 VJ7" bgcolor=#E9E9E9
| 0 ||  || MBA-M || 16.93 || 1.7 km || multiple || 2001–2021 || 01 Jul 2021 || 278 || align=left | Disc.: LINEARAlt.: 2010 XN40 || 
|- id="2001 VG16" bgcolor=#FFC2E0
| 7 ||  || APO || 25.3 || data-sort-value="0.031" | 31 m || single || 4 days || 16 Nov 2001 || 22 || align=left | Disc.: LINEAR || 
|- id="2001 VL22" bgcolor=#E9E9E9
| 0 ||  || MBA-M || 16.8 || 2.9 km || multiple || 2001–2021 || 12 Jan 2021 || 174 || align=left | Disc.: LINEAR || 
|- id="2001 VE27" bgcolor=#FA8072
| 2 ||  || MCA || 18.4 || data-sort-value="0.62" | 620 m || multiple || 2001–2012 || 22 Oct 2012 || 41 || align=left | Disc.: LINEAR || 
|- id="2001 VM57" bgcolor=#fefefe
| 0 ||  || MBA-I || 18.72 || data-sort-value="0.54" | 540 m || multiple || 2001–2022 || 27 Jan 2022 || 89 || align=left | Disc.: LINEARAlt.: 2014 SX256 || 
|- id="2001 VQ64" bgcolor=#d6d6d6
| 2 ||  || MBA-O || 16.8 || 2.4 km || multiple || 2001–2020 || 19 Apr 2020 || 94 || align=left | Disc.: LINEAR || 
|- id="2001 VL67" bgcolor=#d6d6d6
| 0 ||  || MBA-O || 16.77 || 2.5 km || multiple || 2001–2021 || 13 Jun 2021 || 104 || align=left | Disc.: LINEAR || 
|- id="2001 VE68" bgcolor=#FA8072
| 2 ||  || MCA || 18.0 || data-sort-value="0.75" | 750 m || multiple || 2001–2016 || 08 Dec 2016 || 52 || align=left | Disc.: LINEAR || 
|- id="2001 VB70" bgcolor=#d6d6d6
| 3 ||  || MBA-O || 16.7 || 2.5 km || multiple || 2001–2017 || 25 Dec 2017 || 44 || align=left | Disc.: LINEAR || 
|- id="2001 VN71" bgcolor=#C2E0FF
| 1 ||  || TNO || 9.1 || 72 km || multiple || 2001–2020 || 18 Feb 2020 || 24 || align=left | Disc.: Mauna Kea Obs.LoUTNOs, plutino || 
|- id="2001 VM72" bgcolor=#E9E9E9
| 0 ||  || MBA-M || 17.6 || 1.3 km || multiple || 2001–2021 || 09 Apr 2021 || 42 || align=left | Disc.: Spacewatch || 
|- id="2001 VD73" bgcolor=#fefefe
| 0 ||  || MBA-I || 18.0 || data-sort-value="0.75" | 750 m || multiple || 2001–2021 || 12 Jan 2021 || 123 || align=left | Disc.: Spacewatch || 
|- id="2001 VF73" bgcolor=#d6d6d6
| 0 ||  || MBA-O || 17.1 || 2.1 km || multiple || 1995–2020 || 22 Apr 2020 || 66 || align=left | Disc.: SpacewatchAdded on 22 July 2020Alt.: 2019 AW25 || 
|- id="2001 VO73" bgcolor=#E9E9E9
| 0 ||  || MBA-M || 17.37 || 1.4 km || multiple || 2001–2021 || 04 May 2021 || 93 || align=left | Disc.: SpacewatchAdded on 22 July 2020Alt.: 2009 SM149 || 
|- id="2001 VL74" bgcolor=#E9E9E9
| 0 ||  || MBA-M || 18.3 || data-sort-value="0.92" | 920 m || multiple || 2001–2020 || 29 Jan 2020 || 30 || align=left | Disc.: SpacewatchAlt.: 2014 WM129 || 
|- id="2001 VV74" bgcolor=#E9E9E9
| 1 ||  || MBA-M || 18.20 || data-sort-value="0.68" | 680 m || multiple || 2001–2021 || 28 Aug 2021 || 59 || align=left | Disc.: LPL/Spacewatch IIAdded on 21 August 2021Alt.: 2009 SE417 || 
|- id="2001 VF75" bgcolor=#FFC2E0
| – ||  || APO || 21.7 || data-sort-value="0.16" | 160 m || single || 9 days || 20 Nov 2001 || 28 || align=left | Disc.: Spacewatch || 
|- id="2001 VJ75" bgcolor=#FFC2E0
| 1 ||  || AMO || 19.9 || data-sort-value="0.37" | 370 m || multiple || 2001–2014 || 19 Dec 2014 || 38 || align=left | Disc.: LINEAR || 
|- id="2001 VK75" bgcolor=#FA8072
| – ||  || HUN || 20.2 || data-sort-value="0.27" | 270 m || single || 31 days || 24 Nov 2001 || 17 || align=left | Disc.: Spacewatch || 
|- id="2001 VY75" bgcolor=#E9E9E9
| 0 ||  || MBA-M || 17.2 || 1.5 km || multiple || 2001–2019 || 05 Nov 2019 || 107 || align=left | Disc.: SpacewatchAlt.: 2008 EO125, 2014 SG286 || 
|- id="2001 VC76" bgcolor=#FFC2E0
| 2 ||  || APO || 19.7 || data-sort-value="0.41" | 410 m || multiple || 2001–2015 || 19 Nov 2015 || 74 || align=left | Disc.: LPL/Spacewatch II || 
|- id="2001 VE76" bgcolor=#FFC2E0
| 8 ||  || APO || 23.6 || data-sort-value="0.068" | 68 m || single || 6 days || 21 Nov 2001 || 21 || align=left | Disc.: LINEAR || 
|- id="2001 VT76" bgcolor=#fefefe
| 0 ||  || HUN || 18.0 || data-sort-value="0.75" | 750 m || multiple || 2001–2020 || 20 Dec 2020 || 162 || align=left | Disc.: LINEAR || 
|- id="2001 VV77" bgcolor=#E9E9E9
| 3 ||  || MBA-M || 18.8 || data-sort-value="0.73" | 730 m || multiple || 2001–2019 || 02 Jan 2019 || 32 || align=left | Disc.: Spacewatch || 
|- id="2001 VX77" bgcolor=#fefefe
| 0 ||  || MBA-I || 18.6 || data-sort-value="0.57" | 570 m || multiple || 2001–2020 || 14 Feb 2020 || 158 || align=left | Disc.: SpacewatchAlt.: 2008 RR105 || 
|- id="2001 VB78" bgcolor=#E9E9E9
| 0 ||  || MBA-M || 17.4 || 1.8 km || multiple || 2001–2021 || 07 Jan 2021 || 84 || align=left | Disc.: Spacewatch || 
|- id="2001 VY83" bgcolor=#d6d6d6
| 1 ||  || MBA-O || 16.5 || 2.8 km || multiple || 2001–2019 || 24 Jan 2019 || 79 || align=left | Disc.: LINEAR || 
|- id="2001 VX84" bgcolor=#fefefe
| 0 ||  || HUN || 17.6 || data-sort-value="0.90" | 900 m || multiple || 2001–2020 || 09 Dec 2020 || 260 || align=left | Disc.: LINEAR || 
|- id="2001 VB85" bgcolor=#fefefe
| 0 ||  || HUN || 18.1 || data-sort-value="0.71" | 710 m || multiple || 2001–2021 || 17 Jan 2021 || 87 || align=left | Disc.: LINEARAlt.: 2011 KS19 || 
|- id="2001 VR87" bgcolor=#fefefe
| 2 ||  || MBA-I || 17.5 || data-sort-value="0.94" | 940 m || multiple || 2001–2019 || 07 Jul 2019 || 75 || align=left | Disc.: LINEARAlt.: 2012 VU3 || 
|- id="2001 VT89" bgcolor=#E9E9E9
| 0 ||  || MBA-M || 17.06 || 2.2 km || multiple || 2001–2021 || 11 May 2021 || 95 || align=left | Disc.: LINEARAlt.: 2014 SA241 || 
|- id="2001 VT91" bgcolor=#E9E9E9
| 0 ||  || MBA-M || 17.23 || 1.5 km || multiple || 2001–2021 || 16 Apr 2021 || 156 || align=left | Disc.: LINEARAlt.: 2014 OB198 || 
|- id="2001 VT101" bgcolor=#d6d6d6
| 2 ||  || MBA-O || 16.4 || 2.9 km || multiple || 2001–2018 || 18 Jan 2018 || 36 || align=left | Disc.: LINEAR || 
|- id="2001 VW101" bgcolor=#fefefe
| 1 ||  || MBA-I || 18.9 || data-sort-value="0.49" | 490 m || multiple || 2001–2020 || 22 Jan 2020 || 55 || align=left | Disc.: LINEARAlt.: 2019 UJ24 || 
|- id="2001 VN107" bgcolor=#d6d6d6
| 2 ||  || MBA-O || 17.9 || 1.5 km || multiple || 2001–2018 || 08 Mar 2018 || 35 || align=left | Disc.: LINEAR || 
|- id="2001 VH121" bgcolor=#fefefe
| 1 ||  || HUN || 18.9 || data-sort-value="0.49" | 490 m || multiple || 2001–2021 || 05 Jan 2021 || 99 || align=left | Disc.: LPL/Spacewatch IIAlt.: 2011 HG62 || 
|- id="2001 VE123" bgcolor=#d6d6d6
| 3 ||  || MBA-O || 17.9 || 1.5 km || multiple || 2001–2018 || 11 Nov 2018 || 39 || align=left | Disc.: SpacewatchAlt.: 2018 RO11 || 
|- id="2001 VH124" bgcolor=#d6d6d6
| 0 ||  || MBA-O || 17.23 || 2.0 km || multiple || 2001–2022 || 25 Jan 2022 || 118 || align=left | Disc.: LINEAR || 
|- id="2001 VL124" bgcolor=#fefefe
| 0 ||  || MBA-I || 18.4 || data-sort-value="0.62" | 620 m || multiple || 2001–2018 || 13 Aug 2018 || 111 || align=left | Disc.: LINEAR || 
|- id="2001 VU124" bgcolor=#d6d6d6
| 1 ||  || MBA-O || 17.1 || 2.1 km || multiple || 2001–2020 || 22 Mar 2020 || 86 || align=left | Disc.: LINEAR || 
|- id="2001 VY124" bgcolor=#E9E9E9
| 1 ||  || MBA-M || 17.8 || 1.5 km || multiple || 2001–2019 || 06 Dec 2019 || 38 || align=left | Disc.: LINEARAlt.: 2014 QV14 || 
|- id="2001 VV126" bgcolor=#E9E9E9
| 0 ||  || MBA-M || 17.35 || 1.4 km || multiple || 2001–2021 || 11 May 2021 || 105 || align=left | Disc.: SDSSAlt.: 2012 DJ10 || 
|- id="2001 VY126" bgcolor=#E9E9E9
| 0 ||  || MBA-M || 17.5 || 1.8 km || multiple || 2001–2021 || 17 Jan 2021 || 66 || align=left | Disc.: SDSSAlt.: 2015 XD207 || 
|- id="2001 VB127" bgcolor=#d6d6d6
| 3 ||  || MBA-O || 17.2 || 2.0 km || multiple || 2001–2017 || 25 Oct 2017 || 30 || align=left | Disc.: SDSS || 
|- id="2001 VC127" bgcolor=#E9E9E9
| 0 ||  || MBA-M || 17.3 || 1.5 km || multiple || 2001–2018 || 14 Aug 2018 || 75 || align=left | Disc.: SDSS || 
|- id="2001 VD127" bgcolor=#E9E9E9
| 0 ||  || MBA-M || 18.0 || 1.1 km || multiple || 2001–2020 || 21 Jan 2020 || 70 || align=left | Disc.: SDSSAlt.: 2014 US55 || 
|- id="2001 VE127" bgcolor=#E9E9E9
| 0 ||  || MBA-M || 17.7 || 1.2 km || multiple || 2001–2021 || 12 Jun 2021 || 56 || align=left | Disc.: SDSSAdded on 17 June 2021 || 
|- id="2001 VK127" bgcolor=#E9E9E9
| 0 ||  || MBA-M || 17.4 || 1.8 km || multiple || 2001–2021 || 14 Apr 2021 || 104 || align=left | Disc.: SDSSAlt.: 2010 OF2 || 
|- id="2001 VL127" bgcolor=#E9E9E9
| 0 ||  || MBA-M || 18.2 || data-sort-value="0.96" | 960 m || multiple || 2001–2020 || 01 Mar 2020 || 59 || align=left | Disc.: SDSSAlt.: 2014 WE418 || 
|- id="2001 VN127" bgcolor=#d6d6d6
| 0 ||  || MBA-O || 17.3 || 1.9 km || multiple || 2001–2020 || 26 May 2020 || 30 || align=left | Disc.: SDSSAdded on 22 July 2020 || 
|- id="2001 VO127" bgcolor=#d6d6d6
| 0 ||  || MBA-O || 16.72 || 2.5 km || multiple || 2001–2021 || 15 Apr 2021 || 42 || align=left | Disc.: SDSSAlt.: 2007 VC328 || 
|- id="2001 VT127" bgcolor=#E9E9E9
| 0 ||  || MBA-M || 17.1 || 2.1 km || multiple || 2001–2021 || 17 Jan 2021 || 102 || align=left | Disc.: SDSS || 
|- id="2001 VV127" bgcolor=#fefefe
| 0 ||  || MBA-I || 17.18 || 1.1 km || multiple || 1995–2022 || 12 Jan 2022 || 198 || align=left | Disc.: SDSSAlt.: 2011 FY78, 2013 WZ18 || 
|- id="2001 VW127" bgcolor=#d6d6d6
| 0 ||  || MBA-O || 16.79 || 2.4 km || multiple || 2001–2021 || 31 May 2021 || 87 || align=left | Disc.: SDSS || 
|- id="2001 VZ127" bgcolor=#d6d6d6
| 0 ||  || MBA-O || 17.05 || 2.2 km || multiple || 2001–2021 || 10 Jul 2021 || 70 || align=left | Disc.: SDSS || 
|- id="2001 VE128" bgcolor=#fefefe
| 0 ||  || MBA-I || 18.4 || data-sort-value="0.62" | 620 m || multiple || 2001–2019 || 26 Sep 2019 || 45 || align=left | Disc.: SDSS || 
|- id="2001 VN128" bgcolor=#d6d6d6
| 0 ||  || MBA-O || 15.39 || 7.2 km || multiple || 2001–2022 || 06 Jan 2022 || 213 || align=left | Disc.: SDSSAlt.: 2010 GE80 || 
|- id="2001 VO128" bgcolor=#C2FFFF
| 0 ||  || JT || 14.4 || 7.3 km || multiple || 2001–2020 || 26 May 2020 || 52 || align=left | Disc.: SDSSAdded on 19 October 2020Trojan camp (L5) || 
|- id="2001 VA129" bgcolor=#E9E9E9
| – ||  || MBA-M || 18.2 || data-sort-value="0.68" | 680 m || single || 10 days || 21 Nov 2001 || 6 || align=left | Disc.: SDSS || 
|- id="2001 VB129" bgcolor=#fefefe
| 0 ||  || MBA-I || 18.0 || data-sort-value="0.75" | 750 m || multiple || 2001–2019 || 16 Dec 2019 || 76 || align=left | Disc.: SDSS || 
|- id="2001 VC129" bgcolor=#C2FFFF
| 0 ||  || JT || 13.94 || 9.1 km || multiple || 2001–2021 || 04 Aug 2021 || 104 || align=left | Disc.: SDSSAdded on 22 July 2020Trojan camp (L5)Alt.: 2010 GN153 || 
|- id="2001 VF129" bgcolor=#d6d6d6
| 0 ||  || MBA-O || 16.2 || 3.2 km || multiple || 2001–2021 || 07 Jun 2021 || 72 || align=left | Disc.: SDSS || 
|- id="2001 VG129" bgcolor=#d6d6d6
| 0 ||  || HIL || 15.0 || 5.6 km || multiple || 1995–2021 || 14 Jun 2021 || 181 || align=left | Disc.: SDSSAlt.: 2012 CY53 || 
|- id="2001 VJ129" bgcolor=#E9E9E9
| 0 ||  || MBA-M || 17.8 || 1.2 km || multiple || 2001–2021 || 10 May 2021 || 39 || align=left | Disc.: SDSSAdded on 21 August 2021 || 
|- id="2001 VN129" bgcolor=#d6d6d6
| 0 ||  || MBA-O || 16.9 || 2.3 km || multiple || 2001–2019 || 28 Feb 2019 || 59 || align=left | Disc.: SDSSAlt.: 2012 XQ84 || 
|- id="2001 VO129" bgcolor=#d6d6d6
| 0 ||  || MBA-O || 16.58 || 2.7 km || multiple || 2001–2021 || 15 Apr 2021 || 66 || align=left | Disc.: SDSSAlt.: 2015 EG50, 2016 LP5 || 
|- id="2001 VP129" bgcolor=#d6d6d6
| 0 ||  || MBA-O || 16.91 || 2.3 km || multiple || 2001–2021 || 09 Apr 2021 || 42 || align=left | Disc.: SDSS || 
|- id="2001 VZ129" bgcolor=#d6d6d6
| 0 ||  || MBA-O || 17.03 || 2.2 km || multiple || 1996–2022 || 09 Jan 2022 || 101 || align=left | Disc.: SDSS || 
|- id="2001 VB130" bgcolor=#d6d6d6
| 0 ||  || MBA-O || 16.9 || 2.3 km || multiple || 1995–2019 || 04 Feb 2019 || 41 || align=left | Disc.: SDSS || 
|- id="2001 VC130" bgcolor=#d6d6d6
| 0 ||  || MBA-O || 16.05 || 3.4 km || multiple || 2000–2021 || 02 Dec 2021 || 92 || align=left | Disc.: SDSSAlt.: 2013 QL101 || 
|- id="2001 VD130" bgcolor=#d6d6d6
| 0 ||  || MBA-O || 16.8 || 2.4 km || multiple || 2001–2020 || 22 Apr 2020 || 95 || align=left | Disc.: SDSS || 
|- id="2001 VH130" bgcolor=#d6d6d6
| 2 ||  || MBA-O || 18.39 || 1.2 km || multiple || 2001–2021 || 13 Sep 2021 || 19 || align=left | Disc.: SDSSAdded on 29 January 2022 || 
|- id="2001 VJ130" bgcolor=#d6d6d6
| 0 ||  || MBA-O || 16.32 || 3.0 km || multiple || 2001–2021 || 14 Jul 2021 || 201 || align=left | Disc.: SDSSAlt.: 2012 VC33 || 
|- id="2001 VK130" bgcolor=#d6d6d6
| 0 ||  || MBA-O || 16.30 || 3.1 km || multiple || 1998–2021 || 02 Oct 2021 || 169 || align=left | Disc.: SDSSAlt.: 2014 EU51 || 
|- id="2001 VQ130" bgcolor=#E9E9E9
| 2 ||  || MBA-M || 17.6 || 1.7 km || multiple || 2001–2019 || 29 Nov 2019 || 56 || align=left | Disc.: SDSSAlt.: 2010 OU29 || 
|- id="2001 VR130" bgcolor=#E9E9E9
| 0 ||  || MBA-M || 17.71 || 1.2 km || multiple || 2001–2021 || 10 May 2021 || 86 || align=left | Disc.: SDSSAlt.: 2014 WO337 || 
|- id="2001 VS130" bgcolor=#d6d6d6
| 0 ||  || MBA-O || 17.07 || 2.1 km || multiple || 2001–2021 || 07 Jun 2021 || 54 || align=left | Disc.: SDSSAlt.: 2012 UA168 || 
|- id="2001 VX130" bgcolor=#d6d6d6
| 0 ||  || MBA-O || 16.67 || 2.6 km || multiple || 2001–2021 || 12 May 2021 || 63 || align=left | Disc.: SDSSAlt.: 2017 SB44 || 
|- id="2001 VZ130" bgcolor=#E9E9E9
| 0 ||  || MBA-M || 17.5 || 1.8 km || multiple || 2001–2020 || 17 Dec 2020 || 87 || align=left | Disc.: SDSS || 
|- id="2001 VB131" bgcolor=#d6d6d6
| 0 ||  || MBA-O || 16.49 || 2.8 km || multiple || 2001–2020 || 21 May 2020 || 79 || align=left | Disc.: SDSSAdded on 21 August 2021Alt.: 2014 FP48 || 
|- id="2001 VL131" bgcolor=#d6d6d6
| 0 ||  || MBA-O || 17.19 || 2.0 km || multiple || 2001–2021 || 09 Aug 2021 || 44 || align=left | Disc.: SDSSAdded on 22 July 2020 || 
|- id="2001 VO131" bgcolor=#d6d6d6
| 1 ||  || MBA-O || 17.0 || 2.2 km || multiple || 2001–2020 || 28 Jan 2020 || 26 || align=left | Disc.: SDSSAdded on 21 August 2021 || 
|- id="2001 VQ131" bgcolor=#fefefe
| 0 ||  || MBA-I || 17.29 || 1.0 km || multiple || 1999–2021 || 03 Dec 2021 || 141 || align=left | Disc.: SDSS || 
|- id="2001 VT131" bgcolor=#E9E9E9
| 0 ||  || MBA-M || 17.0 || 2.2 km || multiple || 2001–2021 || 17 Jan 2021 || 96 || align=left | Disc.: SDSS || 
|- id="2001 VU131" bgcolor=#d6d6d6
| 0 ||  || MBA-O || 17.69 || 1.6 km || multiple || 2001–2020 || 21 Oct 2020 || 61 || align=left | Disc.: SDSSAdded on 17 January 2021Alt.: 2010 JM204 || 
|- id="2001 VV131" bgcolor=#E9E9E9
| 0 ||  || MBA-M || 17.7 || 1.2 km || multiple || 2001–2020 || 18 Apr 2020 || 89 || align=left | Disc.: SDSSAlt.: 2007 EH62 || 
|- id="2001 VZ131" bgcolor=#d6d6d6
| 1 ||  || MBA-O || 17.73 || 1.6 km || multiple || 2001–2022 || 07 Jan 2022 || 26 || align=left | Disc.: SDSSAdded on 30 September 2021 || 
|- id="2001 VE132" bgcolor=#d6d6d6
| 0 ||  || MBA-O || 16.6 || 2.7 km || multiple || 2001–2017 || 24 Aug 2017 || 28 || align=left | Disc.: SDSSAdded on 22 July 2020 || 
|- id="2001 VK132" bgcolor=#C2FFFF
| 0 ||  || JT || 13.13 || 13 km || multiple || 2001–2021 || 08 Aug 2021 || 243 || align=left | Disc.: SDSSTrojan camp (L5)Alt.: 2009 KB36, 2010 GH49 || 
|- id="2001 VS132" bgcolor=#E9E9E9
| 0 ||  || MBA-M || 17.6 || 1.3 km || multiple || 2001–2020 || 22 Jun 2020 || 70 || align=left | Disc.: SDSS || 
|- id="2001 VF133" bgcolor=#E9E9E9
| 0 ||  || MBA-M || 17.8 || 1.5 km || multiple || 2001–2019 || 25 Nov 2019 || 68 || align=left | Disc.: SDSSAlt.: 2014 OB180 || 
|- id="2001 VL133" bgcolor=#fefefe
| 0 ||  || MBA-I || 18.07 || data-sort-value="0.72" | 720 m || multiple || 2001–2021 || 11 May 2021 || 61 || align=left | Disc.: SDSSAlt.: 2015 VE88 || 
|- id="2001 VP133" bgcolor=#E9E9E9
| 2 ||  || MBA-M || 17.9 || 1.1 km || multiple || 2001–2019 || 03 Jan 2019 || 44 || align=left | Disc.: SDSSAlt.: 2018 VA79 || 
|- id="2001 VQ133" bgcolor=#E9E9E9
| 2 ||  || MBA-M || 19.2 || data-sort-value="0.43" | 430 m || multiple || 2001–2017 || 16 Aug 2017 || 21 || align=left | Disc.: SDSS || 
|- id="2001 VS133" bgcolor=#E9E9E9
| 0 ||  || MBA-M || 18.47 || data-sort-value="0.47" | 800 m || multiple || 2001-2022 || 24 Dec 2022 || 30 || align=left | Disc.: SDSS || 
|- id="2001 VU133" bgcolor=#d6d6d6
| 0 ||  || MBA-O || 16.47 || 2.8 km || multiple || 2000–2021 || 11 Sep 2021 || 156 || align=left | Disc.: SDSSAlt.: 2014 DW25 || 
|- id="2001 VB134" bgcolor=#d6d6d6
| 0 ||  || MBA-O || 16.82 || 2.4 km || multiple || 2001–2021 || 10 May 2021 || 74 || align=left | Disc.: SDSSAlt.: 2015 DY128 || 
|- id="2001 VH134" bgcolor=#fefefe
| 0 ||  || MBA-I || 18.5 || data-sort-value="0.59" | 590 m || multiple || 2001–2020 || 17 Dec 2020 || 150 || align=left | Disc.: SDSS || 
|- id="2001 VK134" bgcolor=#d6d6d6
| 0 ||  || MBA-O || 16.91 || 2.3 km || multiple || 2001–2021 || 03 Aug 2021 || 133 || align=left | Disc.: SDSS || 
|- id="2001 VM134" bgcolor=#d6d6d6
| 0 ||  || MBA-O || 16.43 || 2.9 km || multiple || 1995–2021 || 07 Jul 2021 || 124 || align=left | Disc.: SpacewatchAlt.: 1995 SD70 || 
|- id="2001 VO134" bgcolor=#d6d6d6
| 0 ||  || MBA-O || 16.7 || 2.5 km || multiple || 2001–2020 || 11 May 2020 || 80 || align=left | Disc.: SDSS || 
|- id="2001 VS134" bgcolor=#E9E9E9
| 0 ||  || MBA-M || 17.2 || 1.5 km || multiple || 2001–2018 || 09 Nov 2018 || 62 || align=left | Disc.: Spacewatch || 
|- id="2001 VT134" bgcolor=#d6d6d6
| 0 ||  || MBA-O || 17.3 || 1.9 km || multiple || 2001–2019 || 07 Mar 2019 || 58 || align=left | Disc.: Spacewatch || 
|- id="2001 VV134" bgcolor=#fefefe
| 0 ||  || MBA-I || 18.5 || data-sort-value="0.59" | 590 m || multiple || 2001–2020 || 16 Oct 2020 || 98 || align=left | Disc.: Spacewatch || 
|- id="2001 VW134" bgcolor=#d6d6d6
| 0 ||  || MBA-O || 16.8 || 2.4 km || multiple || 2001–2020 || 13 May 2020 || 75 || align=left | Disc.: SDSS || 
|- id="2001 VX134" bgcolor=#E9E9E9
| 0 ||  || MBA-M || 17.49 || data-sort-value="0.94" | 940 m || multiple || 2001–2021 || 08 Nov 2021 || 110 || align=left | Disc.: SDSS || 
|- id="2001 VY134" bgcolor=#E9E9E9
| 0 ||  || MBA-M || 16.5 || 2.8 km || multiple || 2001–2021 || 18 Jan 2021 || 101 || align=left | Disc.: SDSS || 
|- id="2001 VB135" bgcolor=#d6d6d6
| 0 ||  || MBA-O || 16.8 || 2.4 km || multiple || 2001–2020 || 21 Apr 2020 || 67 || align=left | Disc.: Spacewatch || 
|- id="2001 VC135" bgcolor=#fefefe
| 0 ||  || HUN || 19.1 || data-sort-value="0.45" | 450 m || multiple || 2001–2019 || 03 May 2019 || 52 || align=left | Disc.: SDSS || 
|- id="2001 VD135" bgcolor=#d6d6d6
| 0 ||  || MBA-O || 16.5 || 2.8 km || multiple || 2001–2021 || 12 Jun 2021 || 86 || align=left | Disc.: Spacewatch || 
|- id="2001 VE135" bgcolor=#d6d6d6
| 0 ||  || MBA-O || 17.1 || 2.1 km || multiple || 2001–2017 || 24 Nov 2017 || 45 || align=left | Disc.: SDSS || 
|- id="2001 VF135" bgcolor=#E9E9E9
| 0 ||  || MBA-M || 17.0 || 2.2 km || multiple || 2001–2020 || 14 Dec 2020 || 108 || align=left | Disc.: SDSS || 
|- id="2001 VH135" bgcolor=#d6d6d6
| 0 ||  || MBA-O || 16.95 || 2.3 km || multiple || 2001–2021 || 30 May 2021 || 70 || align=left | Disc.: SDSS || 
|- id="2001 VJ135" bgcolor=#fefefe
| 0 ||  || MBA-I || 18.8 || data-sort-value="0.52" | 520 m || multiple || 2001–2020 || 15 Feb 2020 || 64 || align=left | Disc.: Spacewatch || 
|- id="2001 VK135" bgcolor=#d6d6d6
| 0 ||  || MBA-O || 16.8 || 2.4 km || multiple || 2001–2020 || 25 May 2020 || 48 || align=left | Disc.: SDSS || 
|- id="2001 VL135" bgcolor=#d6d6d6
| 0 ||  || MBA-O || 17.08 || 2.1 km || multiple || 2001–2021 || 01 Jul 2021 || 51 || align=left | Disc.: SDSS || 
|- id="2001 VM135" bgcolor=#fefefe
| 0 ||  || MBA-I || 18.75 || data-sort-value="0.53" | 530 m || multiple || 2001–2021 || 15 Apr 2021 || 72 || align=left | Disc.: Spacewatch || 
|- id="2001 VN135" bgcolor=#fefefe
| 0 ||  || MBA-I || 18.5 || data-sort-value="0.59" | 590 m || multiple || 2001–2020 || 08 Oct 2020 || 87 || align=left | Disc.: SDSS || 
|- id="2001 VO135" bgcolor=#fefefe
| 0 ||  || MBA-I || 18.2 || data-sort-value="0.68" | 680 m || multiple || 2001–2020 || 16 Nov 2020 || 80 || align=left | Disc.: LPL/Spacewatch II || 
|- id="2001 VP135" bgcolor=#E9E9E9
| 0 ||  || MBA-M || 17.1 || 2.1 km || multiple || 2001–2021 || 18 Jan 2021 || 50 || align=left | Disc.: SDSS || 
|- id="2001 VQ135" bgcolor=#d6d6d6
| 0 ||  || MBA-O || 16.6 || 2.7 km || multiple || 2001–2021 || 12 Jun 2021 || 58 || align=left | Disc.: LPL/Spacewatch II || 
|- id="2001 VR135" bgcolor=#E9E9E9
| 0 ||  || MBA-M || 18.06 || data-sort-value="0.73" | 730 m || multiple || 2001–2021 || 17 Jun 2021 || 41 || align=left | Disc.: SDSS || 
|- id="2001 VS135" bgcolor=#fefefe
| 0 ||  || MBA-I || 18.2 || data-sort-value="0.68" | 680 m || multiple || 2001–2021 || 08 Jan 2021 || 79 || align=left | Disc.: Spacewatch || 
|- id="2001 VT135" bgcolor=#E9E9E9
| 0 ||  || MBA-M || 17.07 || 2.1 km || multiple || 2001–2021 || 02 May 2021 || 102 || align=left | Disc.: LPL/Spacewatch II || 
|- id="2001 VV135" bgcolor=#d6d6d6
| 0 ||  || MBA-O || 17.9 || 1.5 km || multiple || 2001–2017 || 17 Oct 2017 || 30 || align=left | Disc.: SDSS || 
|- id="2001 VW135" bgcolor=#d6d6d6
| 0 ||  || MBA-O || 17.00 || 2.2 km || multiple || 2001–2021 || 22 May 2021 || 44 || align=left | Disc.: LPL/Spacewatch II || 
|- id="2001 VX135" bgcolor=#fefefe
| 0 ||  || MBA-I || 18.2 || data-sort-value="0.68" | 680 m || multiple || 2001–2021 || 06 Jan 2021 || 57 || align=left | Disc.: SDSS || 
|- id="2001 VY135" bgcolor=#d6d6d6
| 0 ||  || MBA-O || 17.7 || 1.6 km || multiple || 2001–2018 || 15 Jan 2018 || 26 || align=left | Disc.: SDSS || 
|- id="2001 VZ135" bgcolor=#d6d6d6
| 0 ||  || MBA-O || 16.85 || 2.4 km || multiple || 2000–2021 || 31 May 2021 || 41 || align=left | Disc.: SDSS || 
|- id="2001 VA136" bgcolor=#E9E9E9
| 0 ||  || MBA-M || 17.2 || 2.0 km || multiple || 2001–2019 || 19 Dec 2019 || 95 || align=left | Disc.: SDSS || 
|- id="2001 VB136" bgcolor=#d6d6d6
| 0 ||  || MBA-O || 16.64 || 2.6 km || multiple || 1995–2021 || 15 Apr 2021 || 95 || align=left | Disc.: Spacewatch || 
|- id="2001 VC136" bgcolor=#fefefe
| 1 ||  || MBA-I || 18.4 || data-sort-value="0.62" | 620 m || multiple || 2001–2019 || 30 Nov 2019 || 89 || align=left | Disc.: LPL/Spacewatch II || 
|- id="2001 VD136" bgcolor=#E9E9E9
| 0 ||  || MBA-M || 17.5 || 1.8 km || multiple || 2001–2020 || 19 Jan 2020 || 69 || align=left | Disc.: Spacewatch || 
|- id="2001 VE136" bgcolor=#E9E9E9
| 0 ||  || MBA-M || 17.09 || 2.1 km || multiple || 2001–2021 || 18 Apr 2021 || 111 || align=left | Disc.: SDSS || 
|- id="2001 VF136" bgcolor=#E9E9E9
| 0 ||  || MBA-M || 17.6 || 1.3 km || multiple || 2001–2020 || 14 May 2020 || 93 || align=left | Disc.: LPL/Spacewatch II || 
|- id="2001 VG136" bgcolor=#E9E9E9
| 0 ||  || MBA-M || 17.88 || 1.1 km || multiple || 2001–2021 || 17 Apr 2021 || 62 || align=left | Disc.: SDSS || 
|- id="2001 VH136" bgcolor=#E9E9E9
| 0 ||  || MBA-M || 17.1 || 2.1 km || multiple || 2001–2021 || 18 Jan 2021 || 80 || align=left | Disc.: SDSS || 
|- id="2001 VJ136" bgcolor=#d6d6d6
| 0 ||  || MBA-O || 16.23 || 3.2 km || multiple || 2001–2021 || 13 Jul 2021 || 109 || align=left | Disc.: SDSS || 
|- id="2001 VK136" bgcolor=#E9E9E9
| 0 ||  || MBA-M || 17.80 || 1.2 km || multiple || 2001–2021 || 22 Apr 2021 || 68 || align=left | Disc.: SDSS || 
|- id="2001 VL136" bgcolor=#E9E9E9
| 0 ||  || MBA-M || 17.00 || 1.7 km || multiple || 2001–2021 || 02 Apr 2021 || 78 || align=left | Disc.: SDSS || 
|- id="2001 VM136" bgcolor=#E9E9E9
| 0 ||  || MBA-M || 17.92 || 1.1 km || multiple || 2001–2020 || 25 Mar 2020 || 46 || align=left | Disc.: SDSS || 
|- id="2001 VN136" bgcolor=#d6d6d6
| 0 ||  || MBA-O || 16.7 || 2.5 km || multiple || 2001–2020 || 02 Feb 2020 || 68 || align=left | Disc.: SDSS || 
|- id="2001 VO136" bgcolor=#d6d6d6
| 0 ||  || MBA-O || 16.80 || 2.4 km || multiple || 2001–2018 || 07 Nov 2018 || 56 || align=left | Disc.: SDSS || 
|- id="2001 VP136" bgcolor=#fefefe
| 0 ||  || MBA-I || 17.7 || data-sort-value="0.86" | 860 m || multiple || 2001–2020 || 10 Dec 2020 || 63 || align=left | Disc.: SDSS || 
|- id="2001 VQ136" bgcolor=#E9E9E9
| 1 ||  || MBA-M || 18.2 || data-sort-value="0.96" | 960 m || multiple || 2001–2019 || 07 Jan 2019 || 43 || align=left | Disc.: SDSS || 
|- id="2001 VR136" bgcolor=#d6d6d6
| 0 ||  || MBA-O || 16.5 || 2.8 km || multiple || 2001–2020 || 28 Apr 2020 || 65 || align=left | Disc.: SDSS || 
|- id="2001 VS136" bgcolor=#d6d6d6
| 0 ||  || MBA-O || 16.93 || 2.3 km || multiple || 2001–2021 || 10 May 2021 || 64 || align=left | Disc.: SDSS || 
|- id="2001 VT136" bgcolor=#E9E9E9
| 0 ||  || MBA-M || 17.6 || 1.7 km || multiple || 2001–2021 || 12 Jan 2021 || 48 || align=left | Disc.: Spacewatch || 
|- id="2001 VU136" bgcolor=#E9E9E9
| 2 ||  || MBA-M || 18.8 || data-sort-value="0.97" | 970 m || multiple || 2001–2019 || 02 Nov 2019 || 36 || align=left | Disc.: SDSS || 
|- id="2001 VV136" bgcolor=#d6d6d6
| 0 ||  || MBA-O || 16.87 || 2.4 km || multiple || 2001–2021 || 07 Jun 2021 || 80 || align=left | Disc.: SDSS || 
|- id="2001 VW136" bgcolor=#E9E9E9
| 0 ||  || MBA-M || 17.6 || 1.7 km || multiple || 2001–2019 || 28 Dec 2019 || 46 || align=left | Disc.: SDSS || 
|- id="2001 VX136" bgcolor=#E9E9E9
| 0 ||  || MBA-M || 18.23 || 1.3 km || multiple || 2001–2021 || 11 Apr 2021 || 38 || align=left | Disc.: SDSS || 
|- id="2001 VY136" bgcolor=#E9E9E9
| 1 ||  || MBA-M || 17.8 || 1.5 km || multiple || 2001–2019 || 29 Nov 2019 || 36 || align=left | Disc.: SDSS || 
|- id="2001 VZ136" bgcolor=#E9E9E9
| 0 ||  || MBA-M || 16.7 || 1.9 km || multiple || 2001–2020 || 12 Dec 2020 || 74 || align=left | Disc.: LPL/Spacewatch II || 
|- id="2001 VA137" bgcolor=#E9E9E9
| 0 ||  || MBA-M || 18.7 || data-sort-value="0.76" | 760 m || multiple || 2001–2018 || 13 Dec 2018 || 31 || align=left | Disc.: SDSS || 
|- id="2001 VB137" bgcolor=#fefefe
| 0 ||  || MBA-I || 19.34 || data-sort-value="0.40" | 400 m || multiple || 2001–2021 || 07 Nov 2021 || 66 || align=left | Disc.: Spacewatch || 
|- id="2001 VC137" bgcolor=#d6d6d6
| 0 ||  || MBA-O || 16.74 || 2.5 km || multiple || 2001–2021 || 08 Jul 2021 || 107 || align=left | Disc.: SDSS || 
|- id="2001 VD137" bgcolor=#fefefe
| 0 ||  || MBA-I || 18.4 || data-sort-value="0.62" | 620 m || multiple || 2001–2020 || 10 Dec 2020 || 56 || align=left | Disc.: LPL/Spacewatch II || 
|- id="2001 VE137" bgcolor=#E9E9E9
| 0 ||  || MBA-M || 17.9 || 1.1 km || multiple || 2001–2018 || 07 Aug 2018 || 37 || align=left | Disc.: Spacewatch || 
|- id="2001 VF137" bgcolor=#fefefe
| 0 ||  || MBA-I || 18.87 || data-sort-value="0.50" | 500 m || multiple || 2001–2021 || 15 Apr 2021 || 41 || align=left | Disc.: LPL/Spacewatch II || 
|- id="2001 VH137" bgcolor=#E9E9E9
| 0 ||  || MBA-M || 17.7 || 1.2 km || multiple || 2001–2019 || 28 Dec 2019 || 28 || align=left | Disc.: SDSS || 
|- id="2001 VJ137" bgcolor=#E9E9E9
| 2 ||  || MBA-M || 17.7 || data-sort-value="0.86" | 860 m || multiple || 2001–2019 || 09 Jan 2019 || 28 || align=left | Disc.: SDSS || 
|- id="2001 VK137" bgcolor=#E9E9E9
| 2 ||  || MBA-M || 19.0 || data-sort-value="0.67" | 670 m || multiple || 2001–2018 || 07 Nov 2018 || 22 || align=left | Disc.: SDSS || 
|- id="2001 VM137" bgcolor=#C2FFFF
| 0 ||  || JT || 14.3 || 7.7 km || multiple || 2001–2020 || 17 Jun 2020 || 68 || align=left | Disc.: SDSSTrojan camp (L5) || 
|- id="2001 VN137" bgcolor=#fefefe
| 0 ||  || MBA-I || 18.9 || data-sort-value="0.49" | 490 m || multiple || 2001–2019 || 19 Dec 2019 || 46 || align=left | Disc.: Spacewatch || 
|- id="2001 VO137" bgcolor=#C2FFFF
| 0 ||  || JT || 14.2 || 8.0 km || multiple || 2001–2020 || 23 May 2020 || 43 || align=left | Disc.: SpacewatchTrojan camp (L5) || 
|- id="2001 VP137" bgcolor=#fefefe
| 0 ||  || MBA-I || 18.17 || data-sort-value="0.69" | 690 m || multiple || 2001–2022 || 25 Jan 2022 || 81 || align=left | Disc.: Spacewatch || 
|- id="2001 VQ137" bgcolor=#E9E9E9
| 2 ||  || MBA-M || 17.3 || 1.0 km || multiple || 2001–2020 || 21 Apr 2020 || 33 || align=left | Disc.: Spacewatch || 
|- id="2001 VR137" bgcolor=#E9E9E9
| 0 ||  || MBA-M || 16.91 || 2.3 km || multiple || 1999–2022 || 27 Jan 2022 || 133 || align=left | Disc.: SDSS || 
|- id="2001 VS137" bgcolor=#E9E9E9
| 0 ||  || MBA-M || 17.44 || 1.8 km || multiple || 2001–2021 || 03 May 2021 || 114 || align=left | Disc.: SDSS || 
|- id="2001 VT137" bgcolor=#d6d6d6
| 0 ||  || MBA-O || 16.4 || 2.9 km || multiple || 2001–2021 || 07 Jun 2021 || 116 || align=left | Disc.: SDSS || 
|- id="2001 VU137" bgcolor=#fefefe
| 0 ||  || MBA-I || 18.8 || data-sort-value="0.52" | 520 m || multiple || 2001–2019 || 19 Dec 2019 || 61 || align=left | Disc.: SpacewatchAlt.: 2013 AG81 || 
|- id="2001 VV137" bgcolor=#fefefe
| 0 ||  || MBA-I || 18.5 || data-sort-value="0.59" | 590 m || multiple || 2001–2020 || 05 Nov 2020 || 96 || align=left | Disc.: Spacewatch || 
|- id="2001 VW137" bgcolor=#d6d6d6
| 0 ||  || MBA-O || 16.90 || 2.3 km || multiple || 2001–2022 || 25 Jan 2022 || 99 || align=left | Disc.: SDSS || 
|- id="2001 VY137" bgcolor=#E9E9E9
| 0 ||  || MBA-M || 17.4 || 1.4 km || multiple || 2001–2018 || 13 Aug 2018 || 54 || align=left | Disc.: Spacewatch || 
|- id="2001 VZ137" bgcolor=#E9E9E9
| 0 ||  || MBA-M || 18.14 || data-sort-value="0.99" | 990 m || multiple || 2001–2021 || 12 May 2021 || 58 || align=left | Disc.: LPL/Spacewatch II || 
|- id="2001 VB138" bgcolor=#E9E9E9
| 1 ||  || MBA-M || 18.3 || data-sort-value="0.92" | 920 m || multiple || 2001–2018 || 13 Dec 2018 || 32 || align=left | Disc.: Spacewatch || 
|- id="2001 VC138" bgcolor=#E9E9E9
| 0 ||  || MBA-M || 17.89 || 1.5 km || multiple || 2001–2021 || 20 Mar 2021 || 32 || align=left | Disc.: SDSS || 
|- id="2001 VE138" bgcolor=#E9E9E9
| 1 ||  || MBA-M || 18.0 || 1.1 km || multiple || 2001–2020 || 19 Jan 2020 || 26 || align=left | Disc.: Spacewatch || 
|- id="2001 VF138" bgcolor=#fefefe
| 0 ||  || MBA-I || 19.0 || data-sort-value="0.47" | 470 m || multiple || 2001–2019 || 06 Oct 2019 || 24 || align=left | Disc.: SDSS || 
|- id="2001 VG138" bgcolor=#E9E9E9
| 0 ||  || MBA-M || 18.4 || data-sort-value="0.88" | 880 m || multiple || 2001–2020 || 02 Feb 2020 || 28 || align=left | Disc.: SDSS || 
|- id="2001 VH138" bgcolor=#E9E9E9
| 0 ||  || MBA-M || 18.03 || 1.0 km || multiple || 2001–2021 || 14 Jun 2021 || 58 || align=left | Disc.: SDSS || 
|- id="2001 VJ138" bgcolor=#E9E9E9
| 2 ||  || MBA-M || 18.44 || 870 m || multiple || 2001-2021 || 07 Feb 2021 || 22 || align=left | Disc.: SDSSAdded on 19 October 2020 || 
|- id="2001 VK138" bgcolor=#E9E9E9
| 1 ||  || MBA-M || 18.2 || 1.3 km || multiple || 2001–2019 || 26 Nov 2019 || 26 || align=left | Disc.: SDSSAdded on 19 October 2020 || 
|- id="2001 VL138" bgcolor=#fefefe
| 3 ||  || MBA-I || 19.4 || data-sort-value="0.39" | 390 m || multiple || 2001–2019 || 20 Dec 2019 || 16 || align=left | Disc.: SDSSAdded on 17 January 2021 || 
|- id="2001 VN138" bgcolor=#C2FFFF
| 0 ||  || JT || 14.41 || 7.3 km || multiple || 2001–2021 || 08 Jul 2021 || 79 || align=left | Disc.: SDSSAdded on 9 March 2021Trojan camp (L5) || 
|- id="2001 VO138" bgcolor=#fefefe
| 0 ||  || MBA-I || 18.51 || data-sort-value="0.59" | 590 m || multiple || 2001–2021 || 21 Apr 2021 || 42 || align=left | Disc.: SDSSAdded on 9 March 2021 || 
|- id="2001 VP138" bgcolor=#E9E9E9
| 0 ||  || MBA-M || 18.0 || 1.4 km || multiple || 2001–2021 || 11 Feb 2021 || 35 || align=left | Disc.: SDSSAdded on 9 March 2021 || 
|- id="2001 VQ138" bgcolor=#fefefe
| 1 ||  || HUN || 19.31 || data-sort-value="0.41" | 410 m || multiple || 2001–2020 || 20 Dec 2020 || 24 || align=left | Disc.: SDSSAdded on 11 May 2021 || 
|- id="2001 VR138" bgcolor=#d6d6d6
| 0 ||  || MBA-O || 17.11 || 2.1 km || multiple || 2001–2021 || 19 Apr 2021 || 31 || align=left | Disc.: SDSSAdded on 17 June 2021 || 
|- id="2001 VS138" bgcolor=#E9E9E9
| 2 ||  || MBA-M || 17.96 || data-sort-value="0.76" | 760 m || multiple || 2001–2021 || 07 Jul 2021 || 28 || align=left | Disc.: SDSSAdded on 17 June 2021 || 
|- id="2001 VT138" bgcolor=#d6d6d6
| 0 ||  || MBA-O || 16.8 || 2.4 km || multiple || 2001–2021 || 31 May 2021 || 36 || align=left | Disc.: SDSSAdded on 21 August 2021 || 
|- id="2001 VU138" bgcolor=#fefefe
| 0 ||  || MBA-I || 18.97 || data-sort-value="0.48" | 480 m || multiple || 2001–2022 || 12 Jan 2022 || 35 || align=left | Disc.: SDSSAdded on 21 August 2021 || 
|- id="2001 VV138" bgcolor=#d6d6d6
| 0 ||  || MBA-O || 17.0 || 2.2 km || multiple || 2001–2021 || 09 Aug 2021 || 34 || align=left | Disc.: SDSSAdded on 21 August 2021 || 
|- id="2001 VW138" bgcolor=#E9E9E9
| 0 ||  || MBA-M || 18.65 || data-sort-value="0.55" | 550 m || multiple || 2001–2021 || 11 Sep 2021 || 64 || align=left | Disc.: SDSSAdded on 30 September 2021 || 
|- id="2001 VX138" bgcolor=#FA8072
| 1 ||  || HUN || 19.2 || data-sort-value="0.43" | 430 m || multiple || 2001–2021 || 13 Apr 2021 || 29 || align=left | Disc.: SpacewatchAdded on 5 November 2021 || 
|- id="2001 VY138" bgcolor=#E9E9E9
| 0 ||  || MBA-M || 18.1 || 1.0 km || multiple || 2001–2021 || 13 May 2021 || 26 || align=left | Disc.: SDSSAdded on 5 November 2021 || 
|- id="2001 VZ138" bgcolor=#d6d6d6
| 0 ||  || MBA-O || 17.2 || 2.0 km || multiple || 2001–2019 || 05 Feb 2019 || 37 || align=left | Disc.: SDSSAdded on 29 January 2022 || 
|- id="2001 VA139" bgcolor=#fefefe
| 0 ||  || MBA-I || 18.3 || data-sort-value="0.65" | 650 m || multiple || 2001–2021 || 05 Jan 2021 || 30 || align=left | Disc.: No observationsAdded on 29 January 2022 || 
|}
back to top

W 

|- id="2001 WU" bgcolor=#fefefe
| 0 || 2001 WU || MBA-I || 18.7 || data-sort-value="0.54" | 540 m || multiple || 2001–2021 || 04 Jan 2021 || 114 || align=left | Disc.: LPL/Spacewatch IIAlt.: 2016 UB87 || 
|- id="2001 WZ" bgcolor=#d6d6d6
| 0 || 2001 WZ || MBA-O || 16.72 || 2.5 km || multiple || 2001–2021 || 05 Jul 2021 || 53 || align=left | Disc.: LPL/Spacewatch II || 
|- id="2001 WF1" bgcolor=#E9E9E9
| 1 ||  || MBA-M || 17.7 || data-sort-value="0.86" | 860 m || multiple || 2001–2019 || 23 Apr 2019 || 97 || align=left | Disc.: LINEAR || 
|- id="2001 WH1" bgcolor=#FFC2E0
| 7 ||  || APO || 20.4 || data-sort-value="0.30" | 300 m || single || 24 days || 11 Dec 2001 || 99 || align=left | Disc.: LINEAR || 
|- id="2001 WV1" bgcolor=#FFC2E0
| 8 ||  || APO || 22.5 || data-sort-value="0.11" | 110 m || single || 3 days || 21 Nov 2001 || 51 || align=left | Disc.: LINEAR || 
|- id="2001 WH2" bgcolor=#FFC2E0
| 1 ||  || AMO || 20.1 || data-sort-value="0.34" | 340 m || multiple || 2001–2005 || 09 Mar 2005 || 114 || align=left | Disc.: LINEAR || 
|- id="2001 WO3" bgcolor=#d6d6d6
| 0 ||  || MBA-O || 17.37 || 1.9 km || multiple || 2001–2021 || 09 Jun 2021 || 137 || align=left | Disc.: Spacewatch || 
|- id="2001 WV3" bgcolor=#E9E9E9
| 0 ||  || MBA-M || 17.79 || 1.2 km || multiple || 2001–2021 || 03 Apr 2021 || 72 || align=left | Disc.: SpacewatchAlt.: 2008 GY147, 2014 WZ103 || 
|- id="2001 WA4" bgcolor=#d6d6d6
| 0 ||  || MBA-O || 16.7 || 2.5 km || multiple || 2001–2021 || 01 Jul 2021 || 36 || align=left | Disc.: Spacewatch || 
|- id="2001 WC4" bgcolor=#d6d6d6
| 0 ||  || MBA-O || 17.24 || 2.0 km || multiple || 2001–2022 || 06 Jan 2022 || 169 || align=left | Disc.: Spacewatch || 
|- id="2001 WJ4" bgcolor=#FFC2E0
| 6 ||  || APO || 27.4 || data-sort-value="0.012" | 12 m || single || 1 day || 21 Nov 2001 || 26 || align=left | Disc.: LPL/Spacewatch II || 
|- id="2001 WL4" bgcolor=#FA8072
| 1 ||  || MCA || 18.2 || data-sort-value="0.68" | 680 m || multiple || 2001–2019 || 02 May 2019 || 36 || align=left | Disc.: LINEAR || 
|- id="2001 WN4" bgcolor=#FA8072
| 4 ||  || MCA || 19.1 || data-sort-value="0.45" | 450 m || single || 72 days || 06 Jan 2002 || 41 || align=left | Disc.: LONEOS || 
|- id="2001 WP4" bgcolor=#FA8072
| 0 ||  || MCA || 19.37 || data-sort-value="0.40" | 400 m || multiple || 2001–2020 || 24 Jan 2020 || 165 || align=left | Disc.: NEATAlt.: 2001 TT103 || 
|- id="2001 WQ4" bgcolor=#FA8072
| 2 ||  || MCA || 18.9 || data-sort-value="0.92" | 920 m || multiple || 2001–2020 || 09 Dec 2020 || 65 || align=left | Disc.: LPL/Spacewatch IIAlt.: 2020 WW1 || 
|- id="2001 WZ4" bgcolor=#E9E9E9
| – ||  || MBA-M || 16.0 || 3.5 km || single || 3 days || 22 Nov 2001 || 12 || align=left | Disc.: LINEAR || 
|- id="2001 WB5" bgcolor=#fefefe
| 0 ||  || HUN || 17.6 || data-sort-value="0.90" | 900 m || multiple || 2001–2021 || 11 Jan 2021 || 125 || align=left | Disc.: LINEARAlt.: 2012 VQ32 || 
|- id="2001 WR5" bgcolor=#FFC2E0
| 0 ||  || AMO || 22.8 || data-sort-value="0.098" | 98 m || multiple || 2001–2016 || 14 Jan 2016 || 81 || align=left | Disc.: LINEAR || 
|- id="2001 WQ6" bgcolor=#E9E9E9
| 0 ||  || MBA-M || 17.1 || 1.6 km || multiple || 2001–2020 || 03 Jan 2020 || 77 || align=left | Disc.: LINEARAlt.: 2016 CK121 || 
|- id="2001 WA7" bgcolor=#E9E9E9
| 1 ||  || MBA-M || 17.5 || 1.3 km || multiple || 2001–2021 || 16 Jun 2021 || 85 || align=left | Disc.: LINEARAlt.: 2014 WV353 || 
|- id="2001 WB7" bgcolor=#fefefe
| 2 ||  || MBA-I || 18.4 || data-sort-value="0.62" | 620 m || multiple || 2001–2020 || 17 Oct 2020 || 78 || align=left | Disc.: LINEARAlt.: 2020 QF43 || 
|- id="2001 WO7" bgcolor=#fefefe
| 0 ||  || MBA-I || 18.6 || data-sort-value="0.57" | 570 m || multiple || 2001–2020 || 20 Dec 2020 || 74 || align=left | Disc.: LINEARAdded on 17 January 2021 || 
|- id="2001 WV7" bgcolor=#E9E9E9
| 0 ||  || MBA-M || 17.0 || 2.2 km || multiple || 2001–2021 || 24 Jan 2021 || 85 || align=left | Disc.: LINEARAlt.: 2014 OO79 || 
|- id="2001 WF13" bgcolor=#d6d6d6
| 0 ||  || MBA-O || 16.3 || 3.1 km || multiple || 2001–2020 || 24 Jun 2020 || 137 || align=left | Disc.: LINEARAlt.: 2014 HU169 || 
|- id="2001 WJ15" bgcolor=#FFC2E0
| 3 ||  || APO || 23.6 || data-sort-value="0.068" | 68 m || single || 28 days || 19 Dec 2001 || 24 || align=left | Disc.: LINEAR || 
|- id="2001 WK15" bgcolor=#FFC2E0
| 1 ||  || APO || 21.2 || data-sort-value="0.20" | 200 m || multiple || 2001–2018 || 14 Dec 2018 || 57 || align=left | Disc.: LINEAR || 
|- id="2001 WM15" bgcolor=#FFC2E0
| 7 ||  || APO || 25.0 || data-sort-value="0.036" | 36 m || single || 4 days || 28 Nov 2001 || 35 || align=left | Disc.: LINEAR || 
|- id="2001 WN15" bgcolor=#FFC2E0
| 8 ||  || APO || 19.4 || data-sort-value="0.47" | 470 m || single || 12 days || 06 Dec 2001 || 27 || align=left | Disc.: LINEAR || 
|- id="2001 WO15" bgcolor=#FFC2E0
| 2 ||  || APO || 22.6 || data-sort-value="0.11" | 110 m || multiple || 2001–2018 || 12 Dec 2018 || 112 || align=left | Disc.: LINEAR || 
|- id="2001 WP15" bgcolor=#FFC2E0
| 2 ||  || AMO || 21.4 || data-sort-value="0.19" | 190 m || multiple || 2001–2006 || 31 Oct 2006 || 40 || align=left | Disc.: NEATNEAT || 
|- id="2001 WU15" bgcolor=#FA8072
| 0 ||  || MCA || 18.78 || data-sort-value="0.52" | 520 m || multiple || 1994–2021 || 03 Dec 2021 || 176 || align=left | Disc.: SpacewatchAlt.: 2004 PZ46 || 
|- id="2001 WW15" bgcolor=#fefefe
| 1 ||  || HUN || 17.9 || data-sort-value="0.78" | 780 m || multiple || 2001–2021 || 09 Jun 2021 || 143 || align=left | Disc.: LINEAR || 
|- id="2001 WV19" bgcolor=#E9E9E9
| 2 ||  || MBA-M || 17.6 || 1.7 km || multiple || 2001–2019 || 21 Oct 2019 || 123 || align=left | Disc.: LINEARAlt.: 2010 NR54, 2010 TG167 || 
|- id="2001 WZ19" bgcolor=#fefefe
| 0 ||  || MBA-I || 18.51 || data-sort-value="0.59" | 590 m || multiple || 2001–2022 || 07 Jan 2022 || 65 || align=left | Disc.: LINEARAlt.: 2014 SJ163, 2016 GF109 || 
|- id="2001 WY20" bgcolor=#E9E9E9
| 1 ||  || MBA-M || 17.1 || 2.1 km || multiple || 2001–2020 || 26 Jan 2020 || 215 || align=left | Disc.: LINEAR || 
|- id="2001 WF21" bgcolor=#fefefe
| 0 ||  || MBA-I || 18.0 || data-sort-value="0.75" | 750 m || multiple || 1997–2019 || 25 Nov 2019 || 90 || align=left | Disc.: LINEARAlt.: 2017 BT76 || 
|- id="2001 WD22" bgcolor=#fefefe
| 2 ||  || HUN || 19.2 || data-sort-value="0.43" | 430 m || multiple || 2001–2021 || 18 May 2021 || 34 || align=left | Disc.: LINEARAdded on 21 August 2021Alt.: 2021 GV16 || 
|- id="2001 WF22" bgcolor=#E9E9E9
| 0 ||  || MBA-M || 17.1 || 1.1 km || multiple || 2001–2018 || 04 Dec 2018 || 31 || align=left | Disc.: Kitt Peak Obs.Added on 19 October 2020 || 
|- id="2001 WJ22" bgcolor=#E9E9E9
| 0 ||  || MBA-M || 17.4 || 1.4 km || multiple || 2001–2020 || 25 Mar 2020 || 107 || align=left | Disc.: Kitt Peak Obs.Alt.: 2001 YC161, 2014 WT31, 2016 GD127 || 
|- id="2001 WK22" bgcolor=#fefefe
| 0 ||  || MBA-I || 19.32 || data-sort-value="0.41" | 410 m || multiple || 2001–2020 || 22 Aug 2020 || 41 || align=left | Disc.: Kitt Peak Obs.Added on 17 June 2021Alt.: 2014 WV380 || 
|- id="2001 WL22" bgcolor=#FA8072
| 1 ||  || MCA || 20.30 || data-sort-value="0.26" | 260 m || multiple || 2001–2021 || 28 Nov 2021 || 33 || align=left | Disc.: Kitt Peak Obs. || 
|- id="2001 WS22" bgcolor=#d6d6d6
| 0 ||  || MBA-O || 16.73 || 2.5 km || multiple || 2001–2021 || 11 May 2021 || 101 || align=left | Disc.: Kitt Peak Obs. || 
|- id="2001 WU22" bgcolor=#E9E9E9
| 0 ||  || MBA-M || 17.81 || 1.2 km || multiple || 2001–2021 || 08 Jun 2021 || 94 || align=left | Disc.: Kitt Peak Obs. || 
|- id="2001 WY22" bgcolor=#fefefe
| 0 ||  || MBA-I || 18.55 || data-sort-value="0.58" | 580 m || multiple || 2001–2021 || 03 Dec 2021 || 130 || align=left | Disc.: Kitt Peak Obs. || 
|- id="2001 WT23" bgcolor=#d6d6d6
| 3 ||  || MBA-O || 18.5 || 1.1 km || multiple || 2001–2018 || 28 Nov 2018 || 17 || align=left | Disc.: SpacewatchAdded on 24 December 2021 || 
|- id="2001 WC24" bgcolor=#E9E9E9
| 0 ||  || MBA-M || 16.90 || 1.8 km || multiple || 2001–2021 || 29 Aug 2021 || 121 || align=left | Disc.: SpacewatchAdded on 22 July 2020Alt.: 2004 MF || 
|- id="2001 WE24" bgcolor=#E9E9E9
| 0 ||  || MBA-M || 17.6 || 1.7 km || multiple || 2001–2019 || 04 Dec 2019 || 49 || align=left | Disc.: LPL/Spacewatch II || 
|- id="2001 WF24" bgcolor=#fefefe
| 0 ||  || MBA-I || 17.9 || data-sort-value="0.78" | 780 m || multiple || 2001–2021 || 07 Jan 2021 || 68 || align=left | Disc.: LPL/Spacewatch IIAlt.: 2001 UP181 || 
|- id="2001 WM30" bgcolor=#d6d6d6
| 0 ||  || MBA-O || 16.86 || 2.4 km || multiple || 2001–2021 || 14 Apr 2021 || 40 || align=left | Disc.: LINEAR || 
|- id="2001 WV31" bgcolor=#E9E9E9
| 0 ||  || MBA-M || 17.72 || 1.2 km || multiple || 2001–2019 || 02 Jan 2019 || 74 || align=left | Disc.: LINEAR || 
|- id="2001 WO36" bgcolor=#fefefe
| 0 ||  || MBA-I || 18.20 || data-sort-value="0.68" | 680 m || multiple || 2001–2022 || 06 Jan 2022 || 73 || align=left | Disc.: LINEAR || 
|- id="2001 WJ42" bgcolor=#E9E9E9
| 0 ||  || MBA-M || 17.42 || 1.8 km || multiple || 2001–2021 || 15 Apr 2021 || 164 || align=left | Disc.: LINEARAlt.: 2010 VB175, 2014 SD150, 2016 CS168 || 
|- id="2001 WC43" bgcolor=#fefefe
| 0 ||  || MBA-I || 18.24 || data-sort-value="0.67" | 670 m || multiple || 2001–2021 || 09 May 2021 || 177 || align=left | Disc.: LINEARAlt.: 2008 SS297 || 
|- id="2001 WH43" bgcolor=#fefefe
| 1 ||  || MBA-I || 17.8 || data-sort-value="0.82" | 820 m || multiple || 2001–2019 || 29 Sep 2019 || 107 || align=left | Disc.: LINEARAlt.: 2001 UJ121 || 
|- id="2001 WP43" bgcolor=#E9E9E9
| 1 ||  || MBA-M || 18.27 || data-sort-value="0.93" | 930 m || multiple || 2001–2019 || 05 Jan 2019 || 55 || align=left | Disc.: LINEAR || 
|- id="2001 WV43" bgcolor=#E9E9E9
| 0 ||  || MBA-M || 17.27 || 1.0 km || multiple || 2001–2021 || 12 Aug 2021 || 148 || align=left | Disc.: LINEAR || 
|- id="2001 WZ43" bgcolor=#d6d6d6
| 0 ||  || MBA-O || 16.27 || 3.1 km || multiple || 2001–2021 || 19 May 2021 || 123 || align=left | Disc.: LINEARAlt.: 2018 XC8 || 
|- id="2001 WU44" bgcolor=#FA8072
| 0 ||  || MCA || 17.77 || 2.1 km || multiple || 2001–2019 || 13 Feb 2019 || 319 || align=left | Disc.: LINEAR || 
|- id="2001 WK46" bgcolor=#fefefe
| 0 ||  || MBA-I || 17.1 || 1.1 km || multiple || 2001–2021 || 17 Jan 2021 || 127 || align=left | Disc.: LINEAR || 
|- id="2001 WN46" bgcolor=#d6d6d6
| 0 ||  || MBA-O || 16.3 || 3.1 km || multiple || 2001–2020 || 23 Jun 2020 || 124 || align=left | Disc.: LINEARAlt.: 2018 YG3 || 
|- id="2001 WB47" bgcolor=#fefefe
| 0 ||  || MBA-I || 18.3 || data-sort-value="0.65" | 650 m || multiple || 2001–2020 || 08 Nov 2020 || 114 || align=left | Disc.: LINEAR || 
|- id="2001 WF49" bgcolor=#FFC2E0
| 3 ||  || ATE || 22.1 || data-sort-value="0.14" | 140 m || multiple || 2001–2018 || 03 Dec 2018 || 89 || align=left | Disc.: LINEAR || 
|- id="2001 WH49" bgcolor=#FFC2E0
| 8 ||  || APO || 26.0 || data-sort-value="0.022" | 22 m || single || 1 day || 25 Nov 2001 || 6 || align=left | Disc.: LPL/Spacewatch II || 
|- id="2001 WB51" bgcolor=#fefefe
| 0 ||  || HUN || 18.1 || data-sort-value="0.71" | 710 m || multiple || 2001–2019 || 21 Dec 2019 || 209 || align=left | Disc.: LINEARAlt.: 2013 KV8 || 
|- id="2001 WB54" bgcolor=#fefefe
| 0 ||  || MBA-I || 17.4 || data-sort-value="0.98" | 980 m || multiple || 2001–2021 || 18 Jan 2021 || 124 || align=left | Disc.: LINEARAlt.: 2012 VO100 || 
|- id="2001 WC54" bgcolor=#d6d6d6
| 0 ||  || MBA-O || 16.96 || 2.3 km || multiple || 2001–2021 || 12 May 2021 || 63 || align=left | Disc.: LINEAR || 
|- id="2001 WH54" bgcolor=#fefefe
| 0 ||  || MBA-I || 17.9 || data-sort-value="0.78" | 780 m || multiple || 2001–2021 || 05 Jun 2021 || 110 || align=left | Disc.: LINEARAlt.: 2008 VR27, 2015 TB81 || 
|- id="2001 WV54" bgcolor=#d6d6d6
| 0 ||  || MBA-O || 16.6 || 2.7 km || multiple || 2001–2020 || 12 Apr 2020 || 94 || align=left | Disc.: LINEAR || 
|- id="2001 WT56" bgcolor=#E9E9E9
| 2 ||  || MBA-M || 17.9 || 1.1 km || multiple || 2001–2018 || 03 Dec 2018 || 52 || align=left | Disc.: LINEAR || 
|- id="2001 WG57" bgcolor=#d6d6d6
| 0 ||  || MBA-O || 17.06 || 2.2 km || multiple || 2001–2021 || 08 Jul 2021 || 77 || align=left | Disc.: LINEAR || 
|- id="2001 WE58" bgcolor=#E9E9E9
| 0 ||  || MBA-M || 17.5 || 1.3 km || multiple || 2001–2021 || 08 Jun 2021 || 113 || align=left | Disc.: LINEAR || 
|- id="2001 WW58" bgcolor=#d6d6d6
| 0 ||  || MBA-O || 16.7 || 2.5 km || multiple || 2001–2020 || 20 Apr 2020 || 80 || align=left | Disc.: LINEAR || 
|- id="2001 WC60" bgcolor=#E9E9E9
| 0 ||  || MBA-M || 16.91 || 1.7 km || multiple || 2001–2021 || 01 Jul 2021 || 113 || align=left | Disc.: LINEARAlt.: 2014 XC22 || 
|- id="2001 WJ60" bgcolor=#fefefe
| 0 ||  || MBA-I || 18.0 || data-sort-value="0.75" | 750 m || multiple || 2001–2021 || 17 Jan 2021 || 108 || align=left | Disc.: LINEAR || 
|- id="2001 WD64" bgcolor=#E9E9E9
| 0 ||  || MBA-M || 17.7 || 1.2 km || multiple || 2001–2020 || 01 Mar 2020 || 81 || align=left | Disc.: LINEARAlt.: 2014 YX39 || 
|- id="2001 WL65" bgcolor=#fefefe
| 0 ||  || MBA-I || 17.8 || data-sort-value="0.82" | 820 m || multiple || 2001–2020 || 15 Dec 2020 || 259 || align=left | Disc.: LINEARAlt.: 2015 HG64 || 
|- id="2001 WE66" bgcolor=#fefefe
| 1 ||  || MBA-I || 18.5 || data-sort-value="0.59" | 590 m || multiple || 2001–2019 || 20 Dec 2019 || 89 || align=left | Disc.: LINEAR || 
|- id="2001 WQ66" bgcolor=#fefefe
| 1 ||  || MBA-I || 18.3 || data-sort-value="0.65" | 650 m || multiple || 2001–2020 || 16 Sep 2020 || 81 || align=left | Disc.: LINEAR || 
|- id="2001 WB67" bgcolor=#E9E9E9
| 0 ||  || MBA-M || 16.6 || 2.7 km || multiple || 2001–2021 || 17 Jan 2021 || 202 || align=left | Disc.: LINEARAlt.: 2006 XM7, 2010 OA135, 2010 UT51, 2014 PU64, 2015 XL147 || 
|- id="2001 WJ68" bgcolor=#E9E9E9
| 1 ||  || MBA-M || 17.8 || 1.2 km || multiple || 2001–2018 || 13 Dec 2018 || 60 || align=left | Disc.: LINEAR || 
|- id="2001 WL68" bgcolor=#fefefe
| 2 ||  || MBA-I || 18.3 || data-sort-value="0.65" | 650 m || multiple || 2001–2017 || 27 Apr 2017 || 36 || align=left | Disc.: LINEARAlt.: 2008 XF31 || 
|- id="2001 WW68" bgcolor=#d6d6d6
| 0 ||  || MBA-O || 16.40 || 2.9 km || multiple || 2001–2021 || 19 May 2021 || 184 || align=left | Disc.: LINEARAlt.: 2017 OA31 || 
|- id="2001 WJ69" bgcolor=#d6d6d6
| 0 ||  || MBA-O || 16.0 || 3.5 km || multiple || 2001–2021 || 12 Jun 2021 || 129 || align=left | Disc.: LINEARAlt.: 2009 EX13, 2015 HY44 || 
|- id="2001 WS70" bgcolor=#d6d6d6
| 0 ||  || MBA-O || 17.6 || 1.7 km || multiple || 2001–2020 || 21 Oct 2020 || 55 || align=left | Disc.: LINEAR || 
|- id="2001 WC71" bgcolor=#fefefe
| 1 ||  || MBA-I || 17.7 || data-sort-value="0.86" | 860 m || multiple || 2001–2021 || 11 May 2021 || 110 || align=left | Disc.: LINEARAlt.: 2008 WZ3, 2015 UR96 || 
|- id="2001 WA72" bgcolor=#fefefe
| 3 ||  || MBA-I || 18.7 || data-sort-value="0.54" | 540 m || multiple || 2001–2016 || 14 Jan 2016 || 43 || align=left | Disc.: LINEAR || 
|- id="2001 WS72" bgcolor=#fefefe
| 1 ||  || MBA-I || 18.7 || data-sort-value="0.54" | 540 m || multiple || 2001–2019 || 17 Nov 2019 || 77 || align=left | Disc.: LINEAR || 
|- id="2001 WJ73" bgcolor=#fefefe
| 0 ||  || MBA-I || 18.6 || data-sort-value="0.57" | 570 m || multiple || 2001–2020 || 15 Dec 2020 || 54 || align=left | Disc.: LINEARAdded on 22 July 2020Alt.: 2007 RN253 || 
|- id="2001 WR73" bgcolor=#fefefe
| 0 ||  || MBA-I || 18.8 || data-sort-value="0.52" | 520 m || multiple || 2001–2017 || 25 Nov 2017 || 102 || align=left | Disc.: LINEARAlt.: 2012 BC7 || 
|- id="2001 WL74" bgcolor=#E9E9E9
| 3 ||  || MBA-M || 18.9 || data-sort-value="0.70" | 700 m || multiple || 2001–2019 || 04 Jan 2019 || 26 || align=left | Disc.: LINEAR || 
|- id="2001 WM74" bgcolor=#d6d6d6
| 0 ||  || MBA-O || 16.23 || 3.2 km || multiple || 2001–2021 || 12 May 2021 || 131 || align=left | Disc.: LINEARAlt.: 2015 DW189 || 
|- id="2001 WR74" bgcolor=#d6d6d6
| 0 ||  || MBA-O || 16.5 || 2.8 km || multiple || 2001–2020 || 26 Apr 2020 || 151 || align=left | Disc.: LINEARAlt.: 2003 EH42, 2003 GA12, 2005 NX106 || 
|- id="2001 WL76" bgcolor=#fefefe
| 0 ||  || MBA-I || 18.89 || data-sort-value="0.50" | 500 m || multiple || 1999–2021 || 27 Oct 2021 || 86 || align=left | Disc.: LINEARAlt.: 2009 AB40, 2011 ST132 || 
|- id="2001 WM76" bgcolor=#fefefe
| 0 ||  || MBA-I || 18.80 || data-sort-value="0.52" | 520 m || multiple || 2001–2021 || 07 Apr 2021 || 64 || align=left | Disc.: LINEARAlt.: 2006 BR57, 2017 DV86 || 
|- id="2001 WD77" bgcolor=#d6d6d6
| 0 ||  || MBA-O || 16.67 || 2.6 km || multiple || 2001–2021 || 08 May 2021 || 79 || align=left | Disc.: LINEARAlt.: 2018 VD66 || 
|- id="2001 WG77" bgcolor=#d6d6d6
| 0 ||  || MBA-O || 16.2 || 3.2 km || multiple || 2001–2020 || 17 Jun 2020 || 146 || align=left | Disc.: LINEARAlt.: 2017 VE6 || 
|- id="2001 WG78" bgcolor=#E9E9E9
| 0 ||  || MBA-M || 17.2 || 1.5 km || multiple || 2001–2020 || 26 Jan 2020 || 96 || align=left | Disc.: LINEARAlt.: 2014 WZ30 || 
|- id="2001 WO78" bgcolor=#fefefe
| 0 ||  || MBA-I || 18.70 || data-sort-value="0.54" | 540 m || multiple || 2001–2021 || 11 May 2021 || 188 || align=left | Disc.: LINEAR || 
|- id="2001 WR78" bgcolor=#fefefe
| 0 ||  || MBA-I || 18.33 || data-sort-value="0.64" | 640 m || multiple || 1997–2022 || 25 Jan 2022 || 87 || align=left | Disc.: LINEARAlt.: 2005 YJ277 || 
|- id="2001 WE79" bgcolor=#E9E9E9
| – ||  || MBA-M || 17.2 || 1.1 km || single || 15 days || 05 Dec 2001 || 11 || align=left | Disc.: LINEAR || 
|- id="2001 WM79" bgcolor=#E9E9E9
| 0 ||  || MBA-M || 17.2 || 1.5 km || multiple || 2001–2020 || 13 May 2020 || 115 || align=left | Disc.: LINEAR || 
|- id="2001 WY79" bgcolor=#d6d6d6
| 0 ||  || MBA-O || 16.84 || 2.4 km || multiple || 2001–2021 || 02 Oct 2021 || 82 || align=left | Disc.: LINEAR || 
|- id="2001 WP80" bgcolor=#fefefe
| 0 ||  || MBA-I || 18.39 || data-sort-value="0.62" | 620 m || multiple || 2001–2021 || 13 May 2021 || 51 || align=left | Disc.: LINEAR || 
|- id="2001 WB82" bgcolor=#d6d6d6
| 0 ||  || MBA-O || 17.23 || 2 km || multiple || 2001-2022 || 19 Dec 2022 || 67 || align=left | Disc.: LINEARAlt.: 2022 RE72 || 
|- id="2001 WV83" bgcolor=#fefefe
| 1 ||  || MBA-I || 18.7 || data-sort-value="0.54" | 540 m || multiple || 2001–2020 || 22 Apr 2020 || 45 || align=left | Disc.: LINEAR || 
|- id="2001 WF84" bgcolor=#E9E9E9
| 0 ||  || MBA-M || 17.3 || 1.9 km || multiple || 2001–2021 || 16 Jan 2021 || 107 || align=left | Disc.: LINEARAlt.: 2010 NG112, 2010 TD151 || 
|- id="2001 WJ84" bgcolor=#E9E9E9
| 0 ||  || MBA-M || 17.93 || data-sort-value="0.77" | 770 m || multiple || 2001–2021 || 05 Aug 2021 || 38 || align=left | Disc.: LINEARAdded on 22 July 2020 || 
|- id="2001 WL84" bgcolor=#E9E9E9
| 0 ||  || MBA-M || 16.8 || 2.4 km || multiple || 1992–2021 || 17 Jan 2021 || 117 || align=left | Disc.: LINEAR || 
|- id="2001 WZ84" bgcolor=#E9E9E9
| 1 ||  || MBA-M || 18.23 || data-sort-value="0.67" | 670 m || multiple || 2001–2021 || 03 Aug 2021 || 61 || align=left | Disc.: LINEARAlt.: 2005 VO78 || 
|- id="2001 WY85" bgcolor=#fefefe
| 0 ||  || MBA-I || 18.2 || data-sort-value="0.68" | 680 m || multiple || 2001–2021 || 16 Jan 2021 || 117 || align=left | Disc.: LINEARAlt.: 2016 UE22 || 
|- id="2001 WJ86" bgcolor=#d6d6d6
| 1 ||  || MBA-O || 16.9 || 2.3 km || multiple || 2001–2020 || 15 May 2020 || 38 || align=left | Disc.: LINEARAlt.: 2006 SZ291 || 
|- id="2001 WE88" bgcolor=#E9E9E9
| 0 ||  || MBA-M || 16.73 || 1.9 km || multiple || 2001–2021 || 07 Jun 2021 || 90 || align=left | Disc.: LINEAR || 
|- id="2001 WF88" bgcolor=#d6d6d6
| 0 ||  || MBA-O || 16.57 || 2.7 km || multiple || 2001–2021 || 31 May 2021 || 88 || align=left | Disc.: LINEAR || 
|- id="2001 WP88" bgcolor=#d6d6d6
| 0 ||  || MBA-O || 17.76 || 1.8 km || multiple || 2001-2022 || 26 Dec 2022 || 73 || align=left | Disc.: LINEAR || 
|- id="2001 WX88" bgcolor=#fefefe
| 0 ||  || MBA-I || 17.9 || data-sort-value="0.78" | 780 m || multiple || 2001–2020 || 24 Mar 2020 || 46 || align=left | Disc.: LINEAR || 
|- id="2001 WM90" bgcolor=#E9E9E9
| 1 ||  || MBA-M || 18.1 || data-sort-value="0.71" | 710 m || multiple || 2001–2019 || 08 Feb 2019 || 51 || align=left | Disc.: LINEARAlt.: 2005 UQ192 || 
|- id="2001 WF91" bgcolor=#E9E9E9
| 0 ||  || MBA-M || 16.9 || 2.3 km || multiple || 2001–2021 || 08 Jun 2021 || 207 || align=left | Disc.: LINEAR || 
|- id="2001 WN93" bgcolor=#fefefe
| 0 ||  || MBA-I || 18.0 || data-sort-value="0.75" | 750 m || multiple || 2001–2021 || 22 Jan 2021 || 94 || align=left | Disc.: LINEARAlt.: 2012 QD24 || 
|- id="2001 WT93" bgcolor=#E9E9E9
| 0 ||  || MBA-M || 18.20 || data-sort-value="0.96" | 960 m || multiple || 2001–2021 || 12 Jun 2021 || 40 || align=left | Disc.: LINEAR || 
|- id="2001 WW93" bgcolor=#d6d6d6
| 0 ||  || MBA-O || 16.8 || 2.4 km || multiple || 2001–2020 || 27 Apr 2020 || 132 || align=left | Disc.: LINEARAlt.: 2013 AZ26 || 
|- id="2001 WS94" bgcolor=#d6d6d6
| 0 ||  || MBA-O || 17.39 || 1.9 km || multiple || 2001–2020 || 22 Apr 2020 || 42 || align=left | Disc.: LINEARAdded on 22 July 2020Alt.: 2012 TM323 || 
|- id="2001 WJ95" bgcolor=#fefefe
| 0 ||  || MBA-I || 18.9 || data-sort-value="0.49" | 490 m || multiple || 2001–2020 || 27 Jan 2020 || 66 || align=left | Disc.: LINEARAlt.: 2015 TJ291 || 
|- id="2001 WT95" bgcolor=#d6d6d6
| 2 ||  || MBA-O || 17.9 || 1.5 km || multiple || 2001–2017 || 22 Sep 2017 || 30 || align=left | Disc.: Spacewatch || 
|- id="2001 WW95" bgcolor=#fefefe
| 0 ||  || MBA-I || 18.82 || data-sort-value="0.51" | 510 m || multiple || 2001–2019 || 28 Aug 2019 || 33 || align=left | Disc.: SpacewatchAdded on 5 November 2021 || 
|- id="2001 WP96" bgcolor=#E9E9E9
| 3 ||  || MBA-M || 18.7 || data-sort-value="0.76" | 760 m || multiple || 2001–2014 || 29 Dec 2014 || 25 || align=left | Disc.: SpacewatchAlt.: 2014 WF483 || 
|- id="2001 WY96" bgcolor=#E9E9E9
| 0 ||  || MBA-M || 17.72 || 1.6 km || multiple || 2001–2021 || 15 Apr 2021 || 58 || align=left | Disc.: LPL/Spacewatch II || 
|- id="2001 WE97" bgcolor=#d6d6d6
| 0 ||  || MBA-O || 17.06 || 2.2 km || multiple || 2001–2022 || 27 Jan 2022 || 65 || align=left | Disc.: LPL/Spacewatch II || 
|- id="2001 WF97" bgcolor=#E9E9E9
| 2 ||  || MBA-M || 17.0 || 2.2 km || multiple || 2001–2021 || 06 Jan 2021 || 41 || align=left | Disc.: LPL/Spacewatch IIAlt.: 2015 VL140 || 
|- id="2001 WH97" bgcolor=#E9E9E9
| 0 ||  || MBA-M || 16.8 || 2.4 km || multiple || 2001–2021 || 13 Jan 2021 || 92 || align=left | Disc.: LPL/Spacewatch IIAlt.: 2014 KC99 || 
|- id="2001 WT98" bgcolor=#fefefe
| 1 ||  || HUN || 18.7 || data-sort-value="0.54" | 540 m || multiple || 2001–2020 || 07 Dec 2020 || 43 || align=left | Disc.: LINEAR || 
|- id="2001 WV103" bgcolor=#d6d6d6
| 0 ||  || MBA-O || 16.39 || 2.9 km || multiple || 2001–2021 || 13 May 2021 || 85 || align=left | Disc.: LPL/Spacewatch II || 
|- id="2001 WL104" bgcolor=#fefefe
| 0 ||  || MBA-I || 17.9 || data-sort-value="0.78" | 780 m || multiple || 2001–2021 || 05 Jan 2021 || 120 || align=left | Disc.: LINEAR || 
|- id="2001 WN104" bgcolor=#fefefe
| 0 ||  || MBA-I || 17.6 || data-sort-value="0.90" | 900 m || multiple || 1995–2021 || 16 Jan 2021 || 130 || align=left | Disc.: LINEARAlt.: 2012 US71, 2015 PS71 || 
|- id="2001 WO104" bgcolor=#fefefe
| 0 ||  || MBA-I || 17.9 || data-sort-value="0.78" | 780 m || multiple || 2001–2019 || 16 Dec 2019 || 111 || align=left | Disc.: LINEARAlt.: 2012 VT19, 2012 XP39 || 
|- id="2001 WP104" bgcolor=#E9E9E9
| 3 ||  || MBA-M || 17.6 || 1.3 km || multiple || 2001–2018 || 13 Dec 2018 || 42 || align=left | Disc.: LINEAR || 
|- id="2001 WQ104" bgcolor=#fefefe
| 0 ||  || MBA-I || 18.2 || data-sort-value="0.68" | 680 m || multiple || 1997–2020 || 12 Dec 2020 || 80 || align=left | Disc.: LONEOS || 
|- id="2001 WV104" bgcolor=#fefefe
| 0 ||  || MBA-I || 17.7 || data-sort-value="0.86" | 860 m || multiple || 2001–2020 || 17 Dec 2020 || 77 || align=left | Disc.: Spacewatch || 
|- id="2001 WW104" bgcolor=#fefefe
| 0 ||  || MBA-I || 18.36 || data-sort-value="0.63" | 630 m || multiple || 2001–2021 || 05 Jun 2021 || 98 || align=left | Disc.: LPL/Spacewatch II || 
|- id="2001 WX104" bgcolor=#d6d6d6
| 0 ||  || MBA-O || 16.7 || 2.5 km || multiple || 2001–2020 || 24 Jun 2020 || 75 || align=left | Disc.: Spacewatch || 
|- id="2001 WY104" bgcolor=#d6d6d6
| 0 ||  || MBA-O || 17.28 || 1.9 km || multiple || 2001–2020 || 26 May 2020 || 76 || align=left | Disc.: SDSS || 
|- id="2001 WZ104" bgcolor=#d6d6d6
| 0 ||  || MBA-O || 17.1 || 2.1 km || multiple || 2001–2020 || 19 Apr 2020 || 70 || align=left | Disc.: Spacewatch || 
|- id="2001 WA105" bgcolor=#fefefe
| 0 ||  || MBA-I || 18.1 || data-sort-value="0.71" | 710 m || multiple || 2001–2020 || 16 Dec 2020 || 75 || align=left | Disc.: Spacewatch || 
|- id="2001 WE105" bgcolor=#fefefe
| 0 ||  || MBA-I || 17.8 || data-sort-value="0.82" | 820 m || multiple || 2001–2020 || 17 Dec 2020 || 105 || align=left | Disc.: Kitt Peak Obs. || 
|- id="2001 WF105" bgcolor=#E9E9E9
| 0 ||  || MBA-M || 16.99 || 1.7 km || multiple || 2001–2021 || 10 Apr 2021 || 52 || align=left | Disc.: SDSS || 
|- id="2001 WG105" bgcolor=#fefefe
| 0 ||  || MBA-I || 18.4 || data-sort-value="0.62" | 620 m || multiple || 2001–2020 || 15 Dec 2020 || 74 || align=left | Disc.: SDSS || 
|- id="2001 WH105" bgcolor=#d6d6d6
| 0 ||  || MBA-O || 17.11 || 2.1 km || multiple || 2001–2021 || 08 May 2021 || 73 || align=left | Disc.: SDSS || 
|- id="2001 WJ105" bgcolor=#E9E9E9
| 0 ||  || MBA-M || 16.5 || 2.8 km || multiple || 2001–2021 || 09 Jun 2021 || 112 || align=left | Disc.: SDSS || 
|- id="2001 WK105" bgcolor=#fefefe
| 0 ||  || MBA-I || 18.0 || data-sort-value="0.75" | 750 m || multiple || 2001–2021 || 14 Apr 2021 || 108 || align=left | Disc.: SpacewatchAlt.: 2017 BC59 || 
|- id="2001 WL105" bgcolor=#fefefe
| 0 ||  || MBA-I || 18.2 || data-sort-value="0.68" | 680 m || multiple || 2001–2020 || 20 Dec 2020 || 129 || align=left | Disc.: SDSS || 
|- id="2001 WM105" bgcolor=#fefefe
| 0 ||  || MBA-I || 17.9 || data-sort-value="0.78" | 780 m || multiple || 2001–2021 || 18 Jan 2021 || 71 || align=left | Disc.: Spacewatch || 
|- id="2001 WN105" bgcolor=#fefefe
| 0 ||  || MBA-I || 17.8 || data-sort-value="0.82" | 820 m || multiple || 2001–2021 || 15 Jan 2021 || 130 || align=left | Disc.: Spacewatch || 
|- id="2001 WO105" bgcolor=#fefefe
| 0 ||  || MBA-I || 18.51 || data-sort-value="0.59" | 590 m || multiple || 2001–2021 || 15 Apr 2021 || 38 || align=left | Disc.: LPL/Spacewatch II || 
|- id="2001 WP105" bgcolor=#E9E9E9
| 1 ||  || MBA-M || 17.5 || data-sort-value="0.94" | 940 m || multiple || 2001–2019 || 08 Apr 2019 || 32 || align=left | Disc.: SDSS || 
|- id="2001 WQ105" bgcolor=#E9E9E9
| 0 ||  || MBA-M || 17.70 || data-sort-value="0.86" | 860 m || multiple || 1994–2021 || 07 Nov 2021 || 76 || align=left | Disc.: SDSS || 
|- id="2001 WR105" bgcolor=#E9E9E9
| 1 ||  || MBA-M || 17.1 || 1.6 km || multiple || 2001–2019 || 24 Apr 2019 || 33 || align=left | Disc.: SDSS || 
|- id="2001 WS105" bgcolor=#d6d6d6
| 0 ||  || MBA-O || 16.66 || 2.6 km || multiple || 2001–2021 || 03 May 2021 || 37 || align=left | Disc.: Spacewatch || 
|- id="2001 WT105" bgcolor=#fefefe
| 1 ||  || MBA-I || 18.7 || data-sort-value="0.54" | 540 m || multiple || 2001–2021 || 16 Jan 2021 || 68 || align=left | Disc.: Spacewatch || 
|- id="2001 WU105" bgcolor=#E9E9E9
| 0 ||  || MBA-M || 17.45 || 1.8 km || multiple || 2001–2021 || 01 Apr 2021 || 95 || align=left | Disc.: Spacewatch || 
|- id="2001 WV105" bgcolor=#d6d6d6
| 0 ||  || MBA-O || 16.3 || 3.1 km || multiple || 2001–2020 || 16 Apr 2020 || 73 || align=left | Disc.: SDSS || 
|- id="2001 WW105" bgcolor=#d6d6d6
| 0 ||  || MBA-O || 16.13 || 3.3 km || multiple || 2001–2021 || 08 Sep 2021 || 87 || align=left | Disc.: Kitt Peak Obs. || 
|- id="2001 WX105" bgcolor=#d6d6d6
| 0 ||  || MBA-O || 16.67 || 2.6 km || multiple || 2001–2021 || 17 Apr 2021 || 73 || align=left | Disc.: Spacewatch || 
|- id="2001 WY105" bgcolor=#E9E9E9
| 0 ||  || MBA-M || 17.2 || 2.0 km || multiple || 2001–2021 || 09 Jan 2021 || 64 || align=left | Disc.: Spacewatch || 
|- id="2001 WZ105" bgcolor=#E9E9E9
| 0 ||  || MBA-M || 17.1 || 2.1 km || multiple || 1992–2020 || 22 Dec 2020 || 72 || align=left | Disc.: Spacewatch || 
|- id="2001 WA106" bgcolor=#E9E9E9
| 0 ||  || MBA-M || 17.4 || 1.8 km || multiple || 2001–2020 || 22 Dec 2020 || 56 || align=left | Disc.: Spacewatch || 
|- id="2001 WB106" bgcolor=#d6d6d6
| 0 ||  || MBA-O || 16.1 || 3.4 km || multiple || 2001–2020 || 13 May 2020 || 69 || align=left | Disc.: SDSS || 
|- id="2001 WC106" bgcolor=#d6d6d6
| 0 ||  || MBA-O || 16.86 || 2.4 km || multiple || 2001–2021 || 31 May 2021 || 100 || align=left | Disc.: SDSS || 
|- id="2001 WD106" bgcolor=#d6d6d6
| 0 ||  || MBA-O || 17.4 || 1.8 km || multiple || 2001–2019 || 04 Apr 2019 || 50 || align=left | Disc.: Spacewatch || 
|- id="2001 WF106" bgcolor=#fefefe
| 0 ||  || MBA-I || 18.1 || data-sort-value="0.71" | 710 m || multiple || 2001–2020 || 19 Jan 2020 || 66 || align=left | Disc.: Spacewatch || 
|- id="2001 WG106" bgcolor=#d6d6d6
| 0 ||  || MBA-O || 17.2 || 2.0 km || multiple || 2001–2020 || 28 Apr 2020 || 52 || align=left | Disc.: Spacewatch || 
|- id="2001 WH106" bgcolor=#d6d6d6
| 0 ||  || MBA-O || 17.0 || 2.2 km || multiple || 2001–2020 || 23 Jun 2020 || 53 || align=left | Disc.: Spacewatch || 
|- id="2001 WJ106" bgcolor=#fefefe
| 0 ||  || MBA-I || 17.8 || data-sort-value="0.82" | 820 m || multiple || 2001–2020 || 24 Oct 2020 || 78 || align=left | Disc.: SDSS || 
|- id="2001 WK106" bgcolor=#fefefe
| 0 ||  || MBA-I || 18.8 || data-sort-value="0.52" | 520 m || multiple || 2001–2017 || 28 Sep 2017 || 41 || align=left | Disc.: Spacewatch || 
|- id="2001 WL106" bgcolor=#d6d6d6
| 0 ||  || MBA-O || 17.5 || 1.8 km || multiple || 2001–2020 || 07 Dec 2020 || 68 || align=left | Disc.: LPL/Spacewatch II || 
|- id="2001 WM106" bgcolor=#E9E9E9
| 0 ||  || MBA-M || 17.8 || 1.5 km || multiple || 2001–2019 || 29 Nov 2019 || 35 || align=left | Disc.: SDSS || 
|- id="2001 WN106" bgcolor=#fefefe
| 1 ||  || MBA-I || 18.9 || data-sort-value="0.49" | 490 m || multiple || 2001–2019 || 08 Nov 2019 || 39 || align=left | Disc.: Spacewatch || 
|- id="2001 WO106" bgcolor=#E9E9E9
| 0 ||  || MBA-M || 17.38 || 1.4 km || multiple || 2001–2021 || 26 Aug 2021 || 91 || align=left | Disc.: Spacewatch || 
|- id="2001 WP106" bgcolor=#E9E9E9
| 0 ||  || MBA-M || 17.82 || data-sort-value="0.81" | 810 m || multiple || 2001–2021 || 10 Aug 2021 || 51 || align=left | Disc.: AMOS || 
|- id="2001 WQ106" bgcolor=#fefefe
| 0 ||  || MBA-I || 18.8 || data-sort-value="0.52" | 520 m || multiple || 2001–2020 || 19 Jan 2020 || 40 || align=left | Disc.: Spacewatch || 
|- id="2001 WR106" bgcolor=#fefefe
| 0 ||  || MBA-I || 18.88 || data-sort-value="0.50" | 500 m || multiple || 2001–2021 || 31 Aug 2021 || 43 || align=left | Disc.: LPL/Spacewatch II || 
|- id="2001 WS106" bgcolor=#fefefe
| 1 ||  || MBA-I || 18.7 || data-sort-value="0.54" | 540 m || multiple || 2001–2019 || 04 Dec 2019 || 30 || align=left | Disc.: LPL/Spacewatch II || 
|- id="2001 WT106" bgcolor=#E9E9E9
| 0 ||  || MBA-M || 17.33 || 1.0 km || multiple || 2001–2021 || 13 Dec 2021 || 64 || align=left | Disc.: SDSSAlt.: 2010 FT40 || 
|- id="2001 WU106" bgcolor=#fefefe
| 0 ||  || MBA-I || 18.5 || data-sort-value="0.59" | 590 m || multiple || 2001–2019 || 01 Nov 2019 || 32 || align=left | Disc.: SDSS || 
|- id="2001 WV106" bgcolor=#d6d6d6
| 0 ||  || MBA-O || 17.23 || 2.0 km || multiple || 2001–2021 || 30 Jul 2021 || 32 || align=left | Disc.: Spacewatch || 
|- id="2001 WW106" bgcolor=#E9E9E9
| 0 ||  || MBA-M || 17.1 || 2.1 km || multiple || 2001–2020 || 10 Dec 2020 || 93 || align=left | Disc.: Spacewatch || 
|- id="2001 WZ106" bgcolor=#C2FFFF
| 0 ||  || JT || 14.0 || 8.8 km || multiple || 2001–2019 || 31 May 2019 || 71 || align=left | Disc.: LPL/Spacewatch IITrojan camp (L5) || 
|- id="2001 WA107" bgcolor=#fefefe
| 0 ||  || MBA-I || 18.1 || data-sort-value="0.71" | 710 m || multiple || 2001–2019 || 24 Aug 2019 || 55 || align=left | Disc.: Spacewatch || 
|- id="2001 WB107" bgcolor=#fefefe
| 0 ||  || MBA-I || 17.9 || data-sort-value="0.78" | 780 m || multiple || 2001–2019 || 22 Sep 2019 || 46 || align=left | Disc.: LPL/Spacewatch II || 
|- id="2001 WC107" bgcolor=#fefefe
| 0 ||  || MBA-I || 18.9 || data-sort-value="0.49" | 490 m || multiple || 2001–2019 || 24 Sep 2019 || 32 || align=left | Disc.: Spacewatch || 
|- id="2001 WD107" bgcolor=#E9E9E9
| 0 ||  || MBA-M || 18.8 || data-sort-value="0.73" | 730 m || multiple || 2001–2018 || 06 Oct 2018 || 39 || align=left | Disc.: LPL/Spacewatch II || 
|- id="2001 WE107" bgcolor=#d6d6d6
| 0 ||  || MBA-O || 16.4 || 2.9 km || multiple || 2001–2020 || 16 Apr 2020 || 37 || align=left | Disc.: Spacewatch || 
|- id="2001 WF107" bgcolor=#E9E9E9
| 0 ||  || MBA-M || 17.3 || 1.9 km || multiple || 2001–2021 || 16 Jan 2021 || 74 || align=left | Disc.: Spacewatch || 
|- id="2001 WG107" bgcolor=#C2FFFF
| 0 ||  || JT || 13.6 || 11 km || multiple || 2001–2020 || 23 May 2020 || 70 || align=left | Disc.: LPL/Spacewatch IITrojan camp (L5) || 
|- id="2001 WH107" bgcolor=#E9E9E9
| 0 ||  || MBA-M || 17.5 || 1.8 km || multiple || 2001–2019 || 02 Nov 2019 || 41 || align=left | Disc.: LPL/Spacewatch II || 
|- id="2001 WJ107" bgcolor=#fefefe
| 0 ||  || MBA-I || 18.1 || data-sort-value="0.71" | 710 m || multiple || 2001–2019 || 28 Oct 2019 || 38 || align=left | Disc.: Spacewatch || 
|- id="2001 WK107" bgcolor=#d6d6d6
| 0 ||  || MBA-O || 16.9 || 2.3 km || multiple || 2001–2020 || 23 Mar 2020 || 41 || align=left | Disc.: Spacewatch || 
|- id="2001 WL107" bgcolor=#fefefe
| 0 ||  || MBA-I || 18.57 || data-sort-value="0.57" | 570 m || multiple || 2001–2021 || 17 Apr 2021 || 52 || align=left | Disc.: Spacewatch || 
|- id="2001 WM107" bgcolor=#d6d6d6
| 0 ||  || MBA-O || 16.9 || 2.3 km || multiple || 2001–2020 || 17 Feb 2020 || 35 || align=left | Disc.: Kitt Peak Obs. || 
|- id="2001 WO107" bgcolor=#fefefe
| 0 ||  || MBA-I || 18.73 || data-sort-value="0.53" | 530 m || multiple || 2001–2021 || 03 May 2021 || 38 || align=left | Disc.: LPL/Spacewatch IIAdded on 22 July 2020 || 
|- id="2001 WP107" bgcolor=#E9E9E9
| 0 ||  || MBA-M || 17.34 || 1.0 km || multiple || 2001–2021 || 11 May 2021 || 37 || align=left | Disc.: AMOSAdded on 9 March 2021 || 
|}
back to top

References 
 

Lists of unnumbered minor planets